= Saint Martin–Sint Maarten border =

International border

France–Netherlands border Saint Martin–Sint Maarten border
- Map of the island of Saint Martin

Characteristics
- Entities: Saint Martin (France); Sint Maarten (Netherlands)
- Length: 16 km (10 mi)

History
- Established: 23 March 1648; Treaty of Concordia
- Treaties: Franco-Dutch treaty on Saint Martin border controls

The Saint Martin–Sint Maarten border, or France–Netherlands border, is the international border between the Collectivity of Saint Martin, an overseas collectivity of the French Republic, and Sint Maarten, a constituent country of the Kingdom of the Netherlands, on the island of Saint Martin in the Caribbean. The 87-square-kilometre (34 sq mi) island is divided roughly 60:40 between the French Republic (53 km^{2}, 20 sq mi) and the Kingdom of the Netherlands (34 km^{2}, 13 sq mi) by the 16 km (10 mi) border. However, the two parts are roughly equal in population.

The border is completely open and can be crossed freely. There is a movement in both Sint Maarten and Saint Martin promoting the unification of the island, which would remove the border between the two territories.

== Description ==
The border starts in the west at Cupecoy Bay and then proceeds eastward, cutting across Rue de Terre-Basses/Rhine Road. It then runs through the Simpson Bay Lagoon between the island of Little Key (Dutch) and Grand Islet (French). Back on land it crosses Rue de Hollande/Union Road and then turns north-eastwards, running across Sint Peter Hill, Mont des Accords, Concordia Hill, Marigot Hill, Mount Reward and Mount Flagstaff. It then turns south-eastwards and then eastwards, terminating in the east at Oyster Pond bay.

== History ==
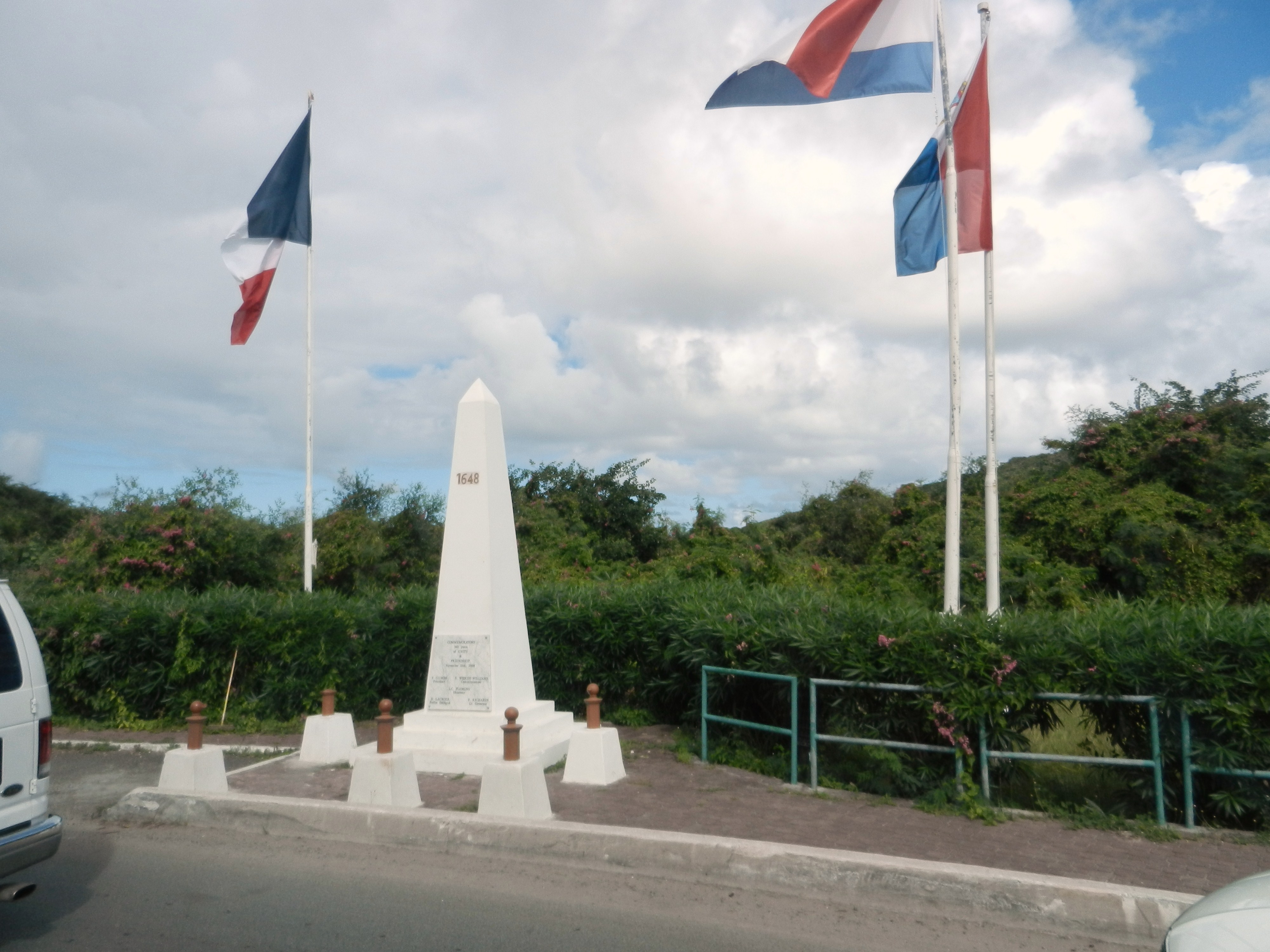
Border monument on Saint Martin

Historically the home of native Arawak and Carib people, the island of Saint Martin was first discovered by Europeans in 1493 when Christopher Columbus sailed by on his second voyage to the Americas. Initially disputed between the Netherlands and Spain, the Spanish withdrew their claim in the 1640s, only for the French to begin settling on the north of the island. To avoid fighting over the matter, France and the Netherlands signed the Treaty of Concordia on 23 March 1648 which formally split the island into two jurisdictions.. The final border was confirmed in 1817. Various local legends relate how the border was supposedly decided by a French and Dutch official walking round the island, the Dutch gaining less land due to their representative being drunk on genever.

In 1994, France and the Netherlands signed the Franco-Dutch treaty on Saint Martin border controls, which improved the mutual border controls at their airports on the island.

For many centuries, the treaty of Concordia did not provide clarity on the exact allotment of various border zones. This appeared especially problematic when debris needed to be cleared in disputed Oyster Pond waters in the wake of hurricane Irma (2017). A quadripartite committee containing Dutch, French, Saint-Martin and Sint Maarten government delegations prepared a final settlement signed in 2023. The French gained additional water rights in Oyster Pond, whereas Sint Maarten obtained a few square kilometres in land mass.

On 16 July 2026, the French National Assembly approved legislation authorizing the ratification of the 2023 agreement defining the border between France's Saint-Martin and Sint Maarten of the Kingdom of the Netherlands. The move formally advanced the settlement of a centuries-old border ambiguity, with the Netherlands still required to complete its own ratification process before the agreement enters into force.
