= Lower Prince's Quarter =

Largest city in Sint Maarten

Lower Prince’s Quarter
- Town
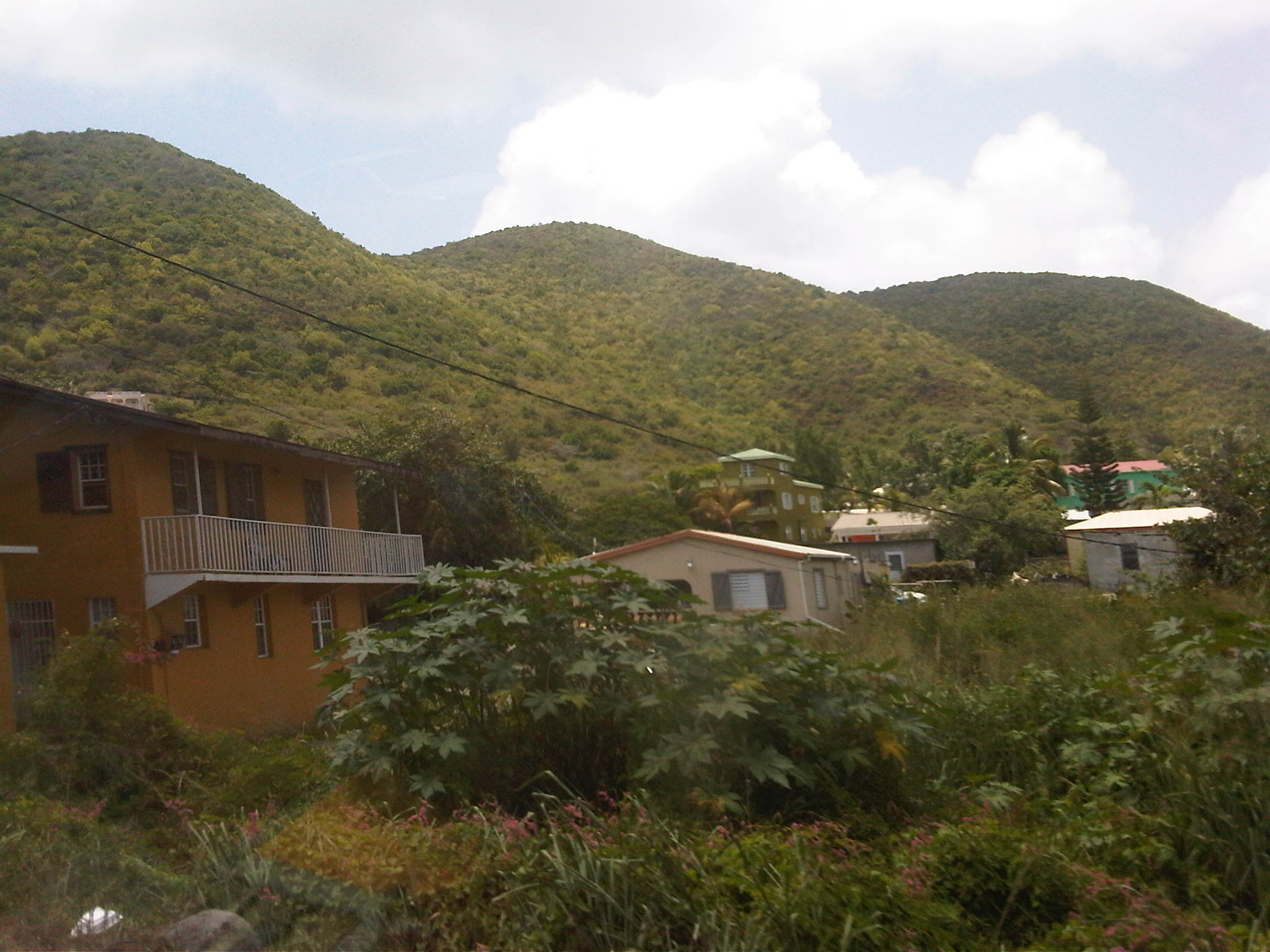

- Location in Sint Maarten
- Coordinates: 18°03′10″N 63°02′33″W
- State: Kingdom of the Netherlands
- Country: Sint Maarten
- Island: Saint Martin

Population (2015)
  - Total: 8,143

Lower Prince's Quarter is a town in Sint Maarten, in the Kingdom of the Netherlands. It has a population of 8,143, making it the largest settlement on the island of Saint Martin.

== Overview ==
The village is named after Prince Hendrik of Orange-Nassau, who visited Sint Maarten in 1835. It consists of a lower and an upper section.

A famous Dutch Quarter Resident was Alec The Butcher, of whom a statue can still be found at a roundabout.

== Belvedere Plantation ==
The Belvedere Plantation was one of the oldest sugar cane plantations on Sint Maarten. The house located on site was originally occupied by the commanders of the Dutch West India Company. The current buildings on the plantation date from around 1860.

In 1995, a large portion of the plantation was repurposed for social housing due to many homes having been destroyed by Hurricane Luis. In 2017, this new neighborhood was heavily damaged by Hurricane Irma. In Belvedere there is a historic park and the archaeological remains of a slave village.

== See also ==
- 1528 Conrada
