= Saint Martin (island) =

Small island in the Caribbean

Native name: Sint Maarten (Dutch) Saint-Martin (French) Nickname: The Friendly Island

Geography
- Location: Caribbean
- Coordinates: 18.06°N 63.05°W
- Archipelago: Leeward Islands, Lesser Antilles, Antilles, West Indies
- Area: 88 km^{2} (34 sq mi)
- Highest elevation: 424 m (1391 ft)
- Highest point: Pic Paradis

Administration
- France
- Collectivity: Saint Martin
- Capital and largest settlement: Marigot (pop. 5,788)
- Area covered: 53 km^{2} (20 sq mi; 0%)
- Kingdom of the Netherlands
- Constituent country: Sint Maarten
- Capital: Philipsburg (pop. 1,900)
- Largest settlement: Lower Prince's Quarter (pop. 8,123)
- Area covered: 34 km^{2} (13 sq mi; 0%)

Demographics
- Demonym: Saint Martiner; Saint-Martinois (French); Sint Maartener (Dutch)
- Population: 73,777 (Jan. 2019)
- Pop. density: 847/km^{2} (2194/sq mi)
- Languages: Dutch; English; French; Saint Martin Creole and Virgin Islands Creole; Spanish; Puerto Rican Spanish; Haitian Creole French; Papiamento
- Ethnic groups: Afro-Caribbean, French, Dutch, Virgin Islanders, Indian, Puerto Ricans, Latino, Chinese and mixed

Additional information
- Time zone: Atlantic Time Zone (UTC–4)

Saint Martin (Note: French: Saint-Martin; Dutch: Sint Maarten) is an island in Leeward Islands of the Lesser Antilles in the northeastern Caribbean, approximately 300 km (190 mi) east of Puerto Rico (United States). The 87 km^{2} (34 mi^{2}) island has been divided since 1648 roughly 60:40 between France (53 km^{2} or 20 mi^{2}) and the Kingdom of the Netherlands (34 km^{2} or 13 mi^{2}), but the Dutch part is more populated than the French. The northern French part comprises the Collectivity of Saint Martin and is an overseas collectivity of France. The southern Dutch part comprises Sint Maarten and is one of four constituent countries that form the Kingdom of the Netherlands. Even though the island is an overseas possession of two European Union member states, only the French part of the island is part of the EU.

On 1 January 2019, the population of the whole island was 73,777 inhabitants, with 41,177 living on the Dutch side and 32,489 on the French side. The figure for the French side is based on censuses that took place after the devastation of Hurricane Irma in September 2017, whereas the figure for the Dutch side is only a post-censal estimate still based on the 2011 census. The first census since Hurricane Irma on the Dutch side of the island took place in October 2022. The population of the island on 1 January 2017, before Hurricane Irma, was 75,869 (40,535 on the Dutch side, 35,334 on the French side).

The island's pre-colonial names include Oualichi (Arawakan, meaning 'the island of women') and Soualiga (Kalinago, meaning 'the island of salt').

Collectively, the two territories are known as "Saint Martin / Sint Maarten", or sometimes "SXM", the IATA identifier for Princess Juliana International Airport, the island's main airport. St. Martin (the French portion) received the ISO 3166-1 code MF in October 2007. In 2010, the Dutch part had its status changed to that of a country within the Kingdom of the Netherlands and was given the code SX.

== Geography ==
Map of Saint Martin

Saint Martin has a land area of 87 km^{2} (34 sq mi), 53 km^{2} (20 sq mi) of which is under the sovereignty of the French Republic, and 34 km^{2} (13 sq mi) under the sovereignty of the Kingdom of the Netherlands. This is the only land border shared by the French Republic and the Kingdom of the Netherlands.

The main cities are Philipsburg on the Dutch side and Marigot on the French side. The Dutch side is more heavily populated. The most populous settlement on the entire island is Lower Prince's Quarter, on the Dutch side.

The highest hilltop is the Pic Paradis (424 m, 1,391 ft) in the centre of a hill chain on the French side. Both sides are hilly with large mountain peaks. This forms a valley where many houses are located. There are no rivers on the island, but there are many dry gullies. Hiking trails give access to the dry forest that covers tops and slopes. The 1648 Treaty of Concordia was signed on the hill lying on the international border between Marigot and Philipsburg, known as Mount Concordia, Concordia Hill, or Mont des Accords.

The island is located south of Anguilla and is separated from that British overseas territory by the Anguilla Channel. Saint Martin is northwest of Saint Barthélemy and is separated from that French overseas collectivity by the Saint-Barthélemy Channel.

Neighbouring islands include Saint Barthélemy (French), Anguilla (British), Saba (Dutch), Sint Eustatius "Statia" (Dutch), and Saint Kitts and Nevis (independent, formerly British).

== History ==
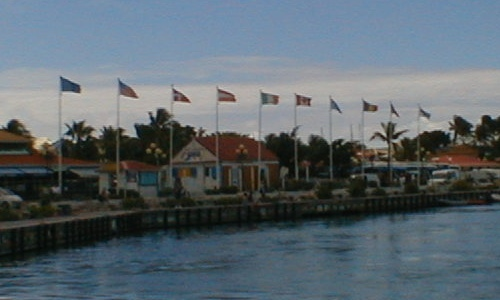
Flags flying in Marigot harbour, Saint-Martin

Saint Martin Unity Flag

It is commonly believed that Christopher Columbus named the island in honour of Saint Martin of Tours when he encountered it on his second voyage of discovery. However, he actually applied the name to the island now called Nevis when he anchored offshore on 11 November 1493, the feast day of Saint Martin. The confusion of numerous poorly charted small islands in the Leeward Islands meant that this name was accidentally transferred to the island now known as Saint-Martin/Sint Maarten.

After jointly reclaiming the island, on 23 March 1648, the Kingdom of France and the Dutch Republic agreed to divide the island between their two territories, and created a formal border with the signing of the Treaty of Concordia. Later conflicts resulted in 16 border changes over the years, but it has been stable since 1816. The French side has 21 square miles (54 km^{2}) and the Dutch side, 16 square miles (41 km^{2}).

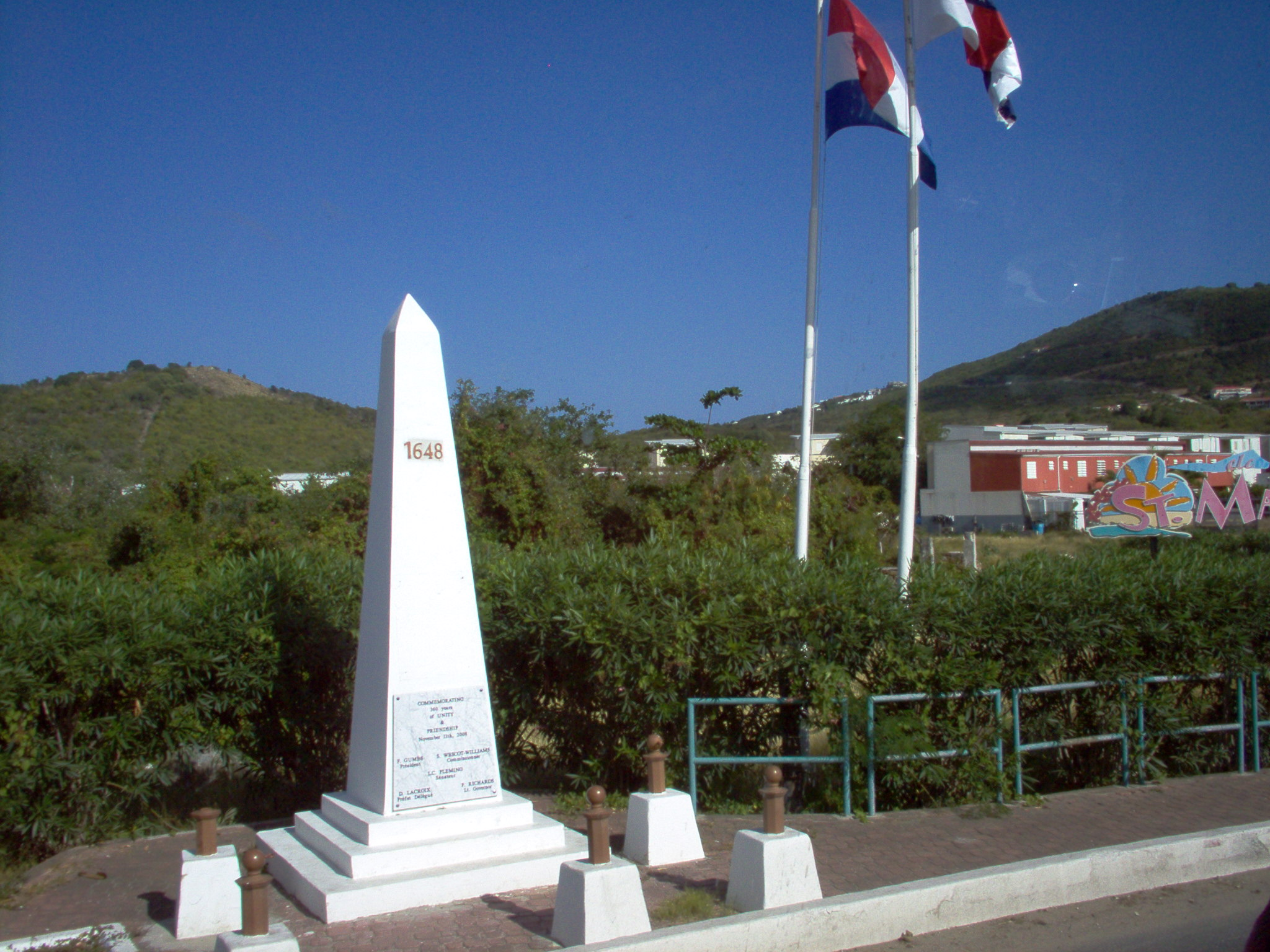
Crossing from St. Martin to Sint Maarten, dedicated in 2008

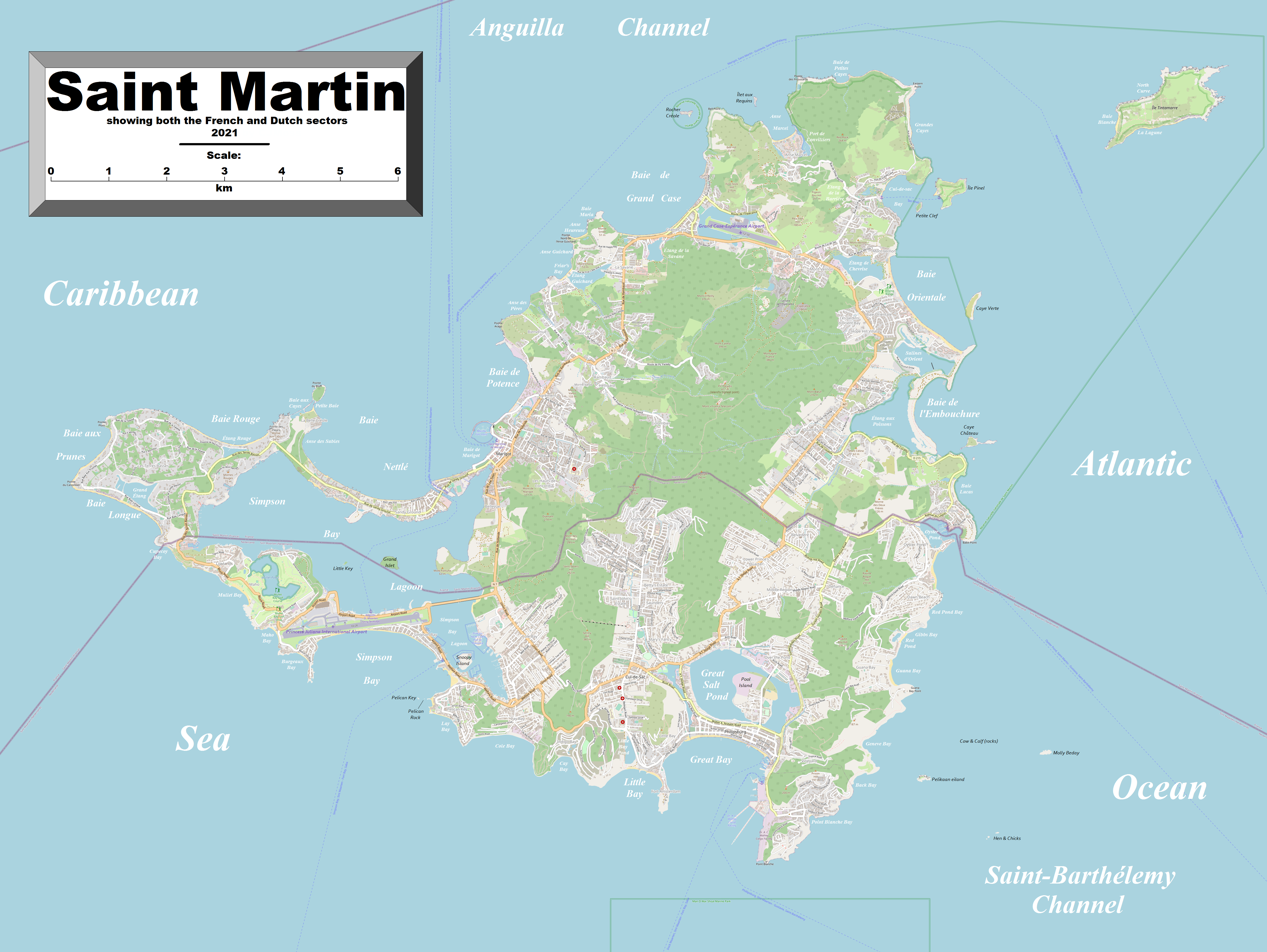
Enlargeable, detailed map of Saint Martin

== Politics ==
Currently, the island is divided into Sint Maarten (the southern half of the island, part of the Netherlands) and the Collectivity of Saint Martin (the northern half of the island, part of France). The island has been divided since the signing of the Treaty of Concordia in 1648, which today remains as one of the oldest treaties still in effect. There currently is a movement aiming to unite the Dutch and French halves of the island of Saint Martin. A "Unity Flag" for representing this unification was created in 1990, and unification of the island enjoys support from the population of both halves.

The Treaty of Concordia allows freedom of movement between both parts of the island, which has promoted a common sentiment among the island's inhabitants, although this is also the reason why some see a formal unification as unnecessary. Other arguments against unification of the island are that neither France nor the Netherlands would allow it and that both sides would require full independence to achieve it.

On 31 August 1990, the "Unity Flag" of Saint Martin was adopted at the Preliminary Conference on National Symbols at the Philipsburg Jubilee Library, in Sint Maarten. This flag was created to represent the people of both halves of the island and the unification of the latter, and is hoisted today on some houses and sometimes by churches and religious groups in Saint Martin. In August 2020, when restrictions and controls were added to the Saint Martin–Sint Maarten border to contain the COVID-19 pandemic, some protesters against these measures flew this flag with them. In September 2020, these restrictions were lifted, and people from both sides of the island started chanting "One island, one people, one destiny". Some notable supporters of this movement include Albert Fleming, former leader of the Collectivity of Saint Martin, who in 2014 stated his support for the unification of the island.

== Climate ==
Under the Köppen climate classification, the island has a tropical savanna climate (Aw) with a dry season from January to April and a rainy season from August to December. The precipitation patterns are due to the movement of the Azores High during the year. With the wind direction predominantly from the east or the northeast, northeasterly trades, temperatures remain stable throughout the year and temperatures rarely exceed 34 °C (93 °F) or fall below 20 °C (68 °F). Temperatures remain steady throughout the year with an average mean temperature of 27.2 °C (81.0 °F). The average sea temperature is 27.2 °C (81.0 °F) ranging from a low of 25.9 °C (78.6 °F) in February to a high of 28.4 °C (83.1 °F) in October. The total average yearly rainfall is 1,047 mm (41.2 in), with 142 days of measurable rainfall. Thunderstorms can occasionally occur, with 18 days with thunder per year. Precipitation totals are quite variable from year to year, depending on the number of passing tropical cyclones.

Because the island is located within the tropics, it is regularly threatened by Atlantic hurricane activity in the late summer and early fall.

=== Hurricane Irma (2017) ===
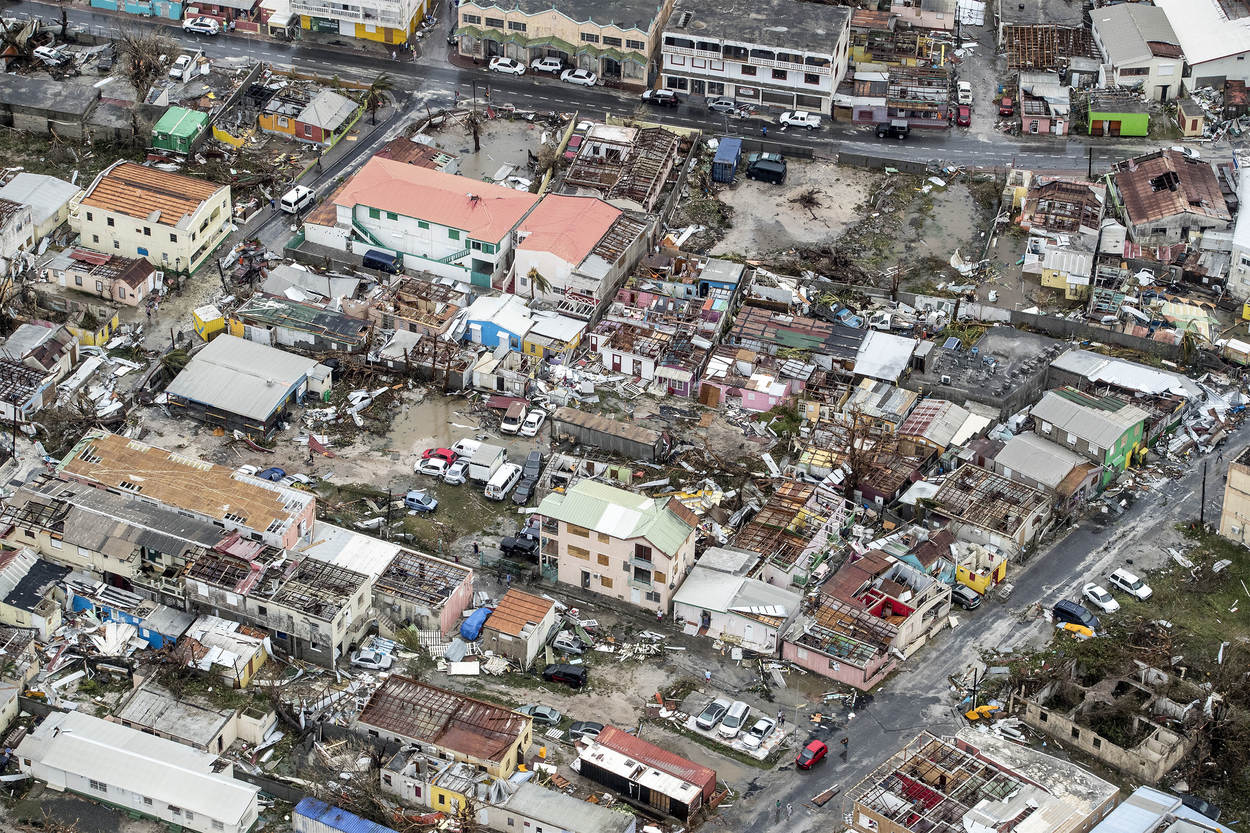
Extensive damage to buildings in Sint Maarten on 7 September 2017, hours after Hurricane Irma made landfall on the island

On 6 September 2017 the island was hit by Hurricane Irma (Category 5 at landfall), which caused widespread and significant damage, estimated at $3 billion, to buildings and infrastructure. A total of 11 deaths had been reported as of 9 July 2018. France's Minister of the Interior, Gérard Collomb, said on 8 September 2017 that most of the schools on the French half of the island were destroyed. In addition to damage caused by high winds, there were reports of serious flood damage to businesses in the village of Marigot. Looting was also a serious problem. Both France and the Netherlands sent aid as well as additional police and emergency personnel to the island. The Washington Post reported that 95% of the structures on the French side and 75% of the structures on the Dutch side were damaged or destroyed.

Some days after the storm had abated, a survey by the Dutch Red Cross estimated that nearly a third of the buildings in Sint Maarten had been destroyed and that over 90 per cent of structures on the island had been damaged. Princess Juliana Airport was extensively damaged but reopened on a partial basis in two days to allow incoming relief flights and for flights that would take evacuees to other islands.

Climate data for Saint Martin (Princess Juliana International Airport) (1991–2020 normals, extremes 1971–2020)
Month	Jan	Feb	Mar	Apr	May	Jun	Jul	Aug	Sep	Oct	Nov	Dec	Year
Record high °C (°F)	32.7 (90.9)	31.6 (88.9)	32.6 (90.7)	33.6 (92.5)	34.0 (93.2)	35.2 (95.4)	34.2 (93.6)	35.1 (95.2)	35.0 (95.0)	34.3 (93.7)	33.9 (93.0)	32.1 (89.8)	35.2 (95.4)
Mean daily maximum °C (°F)	28.6 (83.5)	28.7 (83.7)	29.0 (84.2)	29.6 (85.3)	30.4 (86.7)	31.3 (88.3)	31.5 (88.7)	31.8 (89.2)	31.7 (89.1)	31.2 (88.2)	30.3 (86.5)	29.3 (84.7)	30.3 (86.5)
Daily mean °C (°F)	25.7 (78.3)	25.6 (78.1)	25.8 (78.4)	26.6 (79.9)	27.5 (81.5)	28.4 (83.1)	28.6 (83.5)	28.8 (83.8)	28.8 (83.8)	28.3 (82.9)	27.4 (81.3)	26.4 (79.5)	27.3 (81.1)
Mean daily minimum °C (°F)	23.3 (73.9)	23.2 (73.8)	23.5 (74.3)	24.2 (75.6)	25.3 (77.5)	26.2 (79.2)	26.3 (79.3)	26.5 (79.7)	26.4 (79.5)	25.9 (78.6)	25.1 (77.2)	24.1 (75.4)	25.0 (77.0)
Record low °C (°F)	18.6 (65.5)	18.8 (65.8)	19.1 (66.4)	19.3 (66.7)	20.2 (68.4)	21.8 (71.2)	22.1 (71.8)	21.4 (70.5)	22.0 (71.6)	21.8 (71.2)	20.8 (69.4)	19.9 (67.8)	18.6 (65.5)
Average precipitation mm (inches)	67.9 (2.67)	49.4 (1.94)	46.9 (1.85)	60.1 (2.37)	98.0 (3.86)	55.0 (2.17)	96.6 (3.80)	106.2 (4.18)	116.1 (4.57)	157.0 (6.18)	162.0 (6.38)	101.0 (3.98)	1,116.2 (43.94)
Average precipitation days (≥ 1 mm)	13	11	8	8	10	9	13	14	13	14	14	14	141
Average relative humidity (%)	74.7	74.1	73.6	75.0	75.9	75.1	74.8	75.4	76.3	76.8	77.4	76.6	75.5
Mean monthly sunshine hours	258.1	245.2	274.8	269.9	253.7	245.8	259.1	267.5	245.1	249.2	238.4	247.1	3,053.9
Source 1: National Oceanic and Atmospheric Administration
Source 2: Meteorological Department Curaçao (humidity 1971–2000)

== Economy ==
INSEE estimated that the nominal GDP of the French side of Saint Martin amounted to 582 million euros in 2014 (US$772 million at 2014 exchanges rates; US$660 million at Feb. 2022 exchange rates). The nominal GDP of the Dutch side of the island, Sint Maarten, was estimated at 2,229 million Antillean guilders (US$1,245 million at the official peg) in 2014. The nominal GDP of the entire island was thus US$2.01 billion in 2014.

The nominal GDP per capita of the entire island stood at US$27,923 in 2014.

The Dutch side of the island experienced a deep recession in 2017 and 2018 due to the devastation of Hurricane Irma which struck the island in September 2017. Real GDP experienced a negative growth of -5.8% in 2017 and -6.6% in 2018 (GDP figures after 2018 have not been published yet). GDP of the French side of the island has not been estimated since 2014.

The main industry of the island is tourism. In 2000, the island had about one million visitors annually. About 85% of the workforce was engaged in the tourist industry.

== Demographics ==
On 1 January 2019, the population of the whole island was 73,777 inhabitants, with 41,177 living on the Dutch side and 32,489 on the French side. The figure for the French side is based on censuses that took place after the devastation of Hurricane Irma in September 2017, whereas the figure for the Dutch side is only a post-censal estimate still based on the 2011 census. The first census since Hurricane Irma on the Dutch side of the island is scheduled to take place in October 2022. Population of the island on 1 January 2017, before Hurricane Irma, was 75,869 (40,535 on the Dutch side, 35,334 on the French side).

Due to a major influx of immigrants searching for better employment and living conditions over the past 30 years, the number of Creoles has been surpassed by the number of immigrants. The island's population is highly diverse, containing people from more than 70 countries.

With so many nationalities present, quite a few languages are spoken. An English-based creole is the main local vernacular. However, the official languages are French for Saint-Martin, with Dutch and English being official for Sint Maarten. Other common languages include various French creoles (spoken by French Caribbean immigrants), Spanish (spoken by immigrants from the Dominican Republic, Puerto Rico, and various South American countries), and Papiamento (spoken by immigrants from Aruba, Bonaire and Curaçao).

The most practiced religion is Roman Catholicism in French Saint-Martin, and Protestant denominations in Dutch Sint Maarten, particularly Methodism. The island also has small Jewish, Seventh-day Adventist, Hindu, Muslim, Sikh, Buddhist, and Rastafari communities.

== Culture ==
The island is known for its cuisine, including Creole, French, and West Indian cooking. The island's national dish is broth of conch served with dumplings.

St. Martin's Dutch side has casinos.

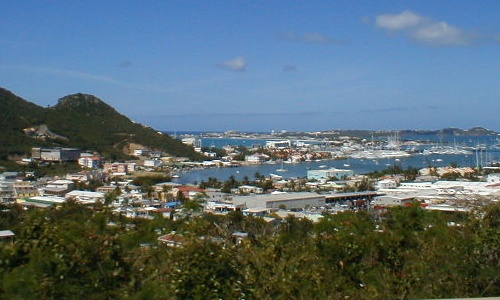
Simpson Bay, Sint Maarten, Dutch side

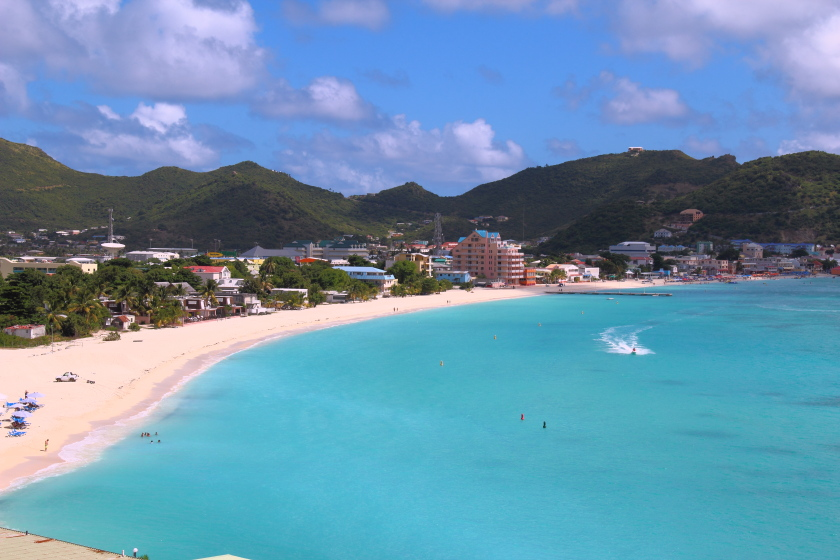
Philipsburg and the Great Bay

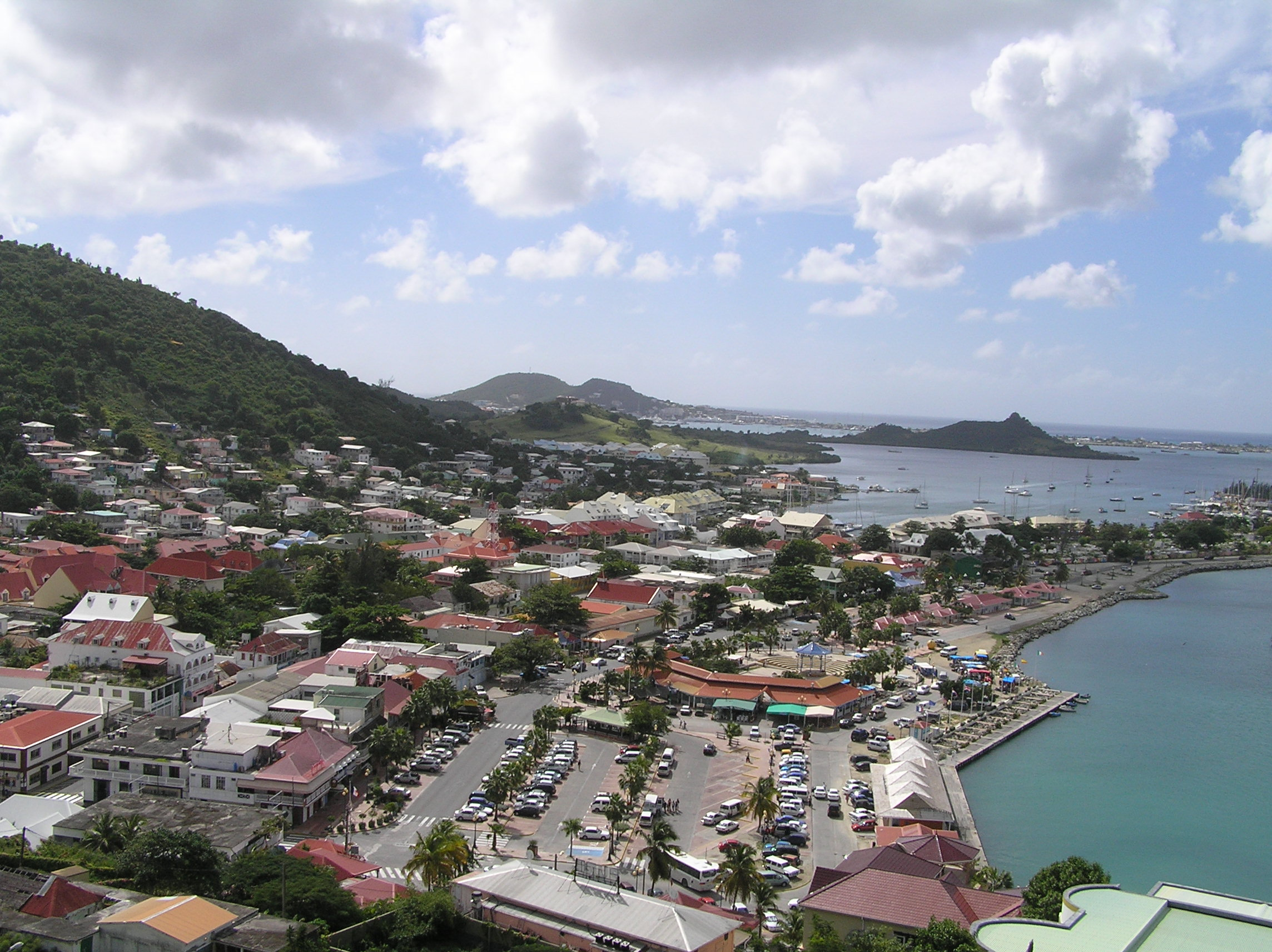
Marigot, Saint Martin, French side

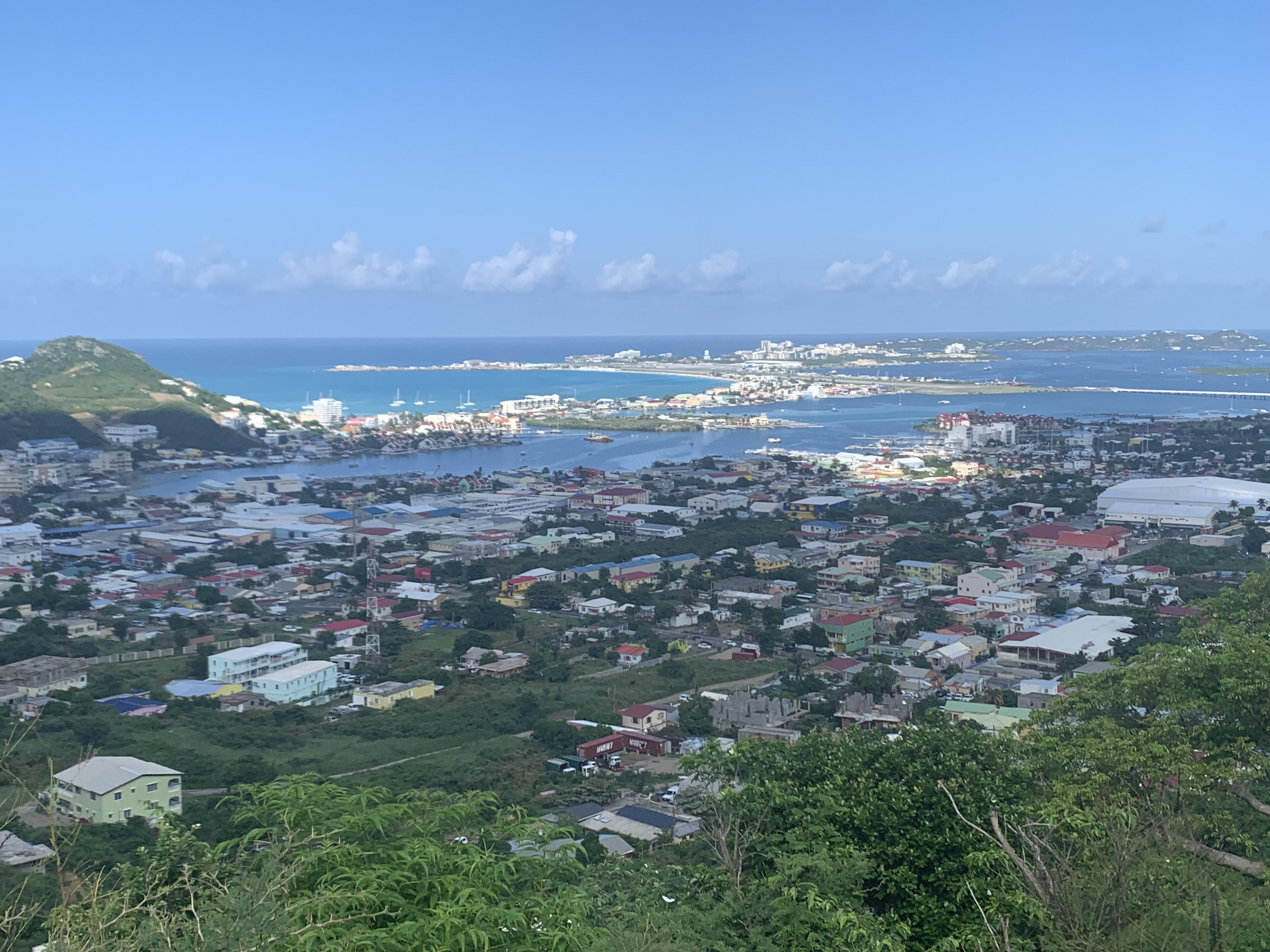
Cole bay (taken atop sentry hill)

== Currency ==
The official currency of Saint Martin is the euro. Sint Maarten uses the Caribbean guilder, pegged at 1.79 per US dollar. As a consequence of the dissolution of the Netherlands Antilles, the Netherlands Antillean guilder ceased to be legal tender and was replaced by the Caribbean guilder, which was originally scheduled for circulation in the first half of 2021, and then for 2024.

== Transport ==
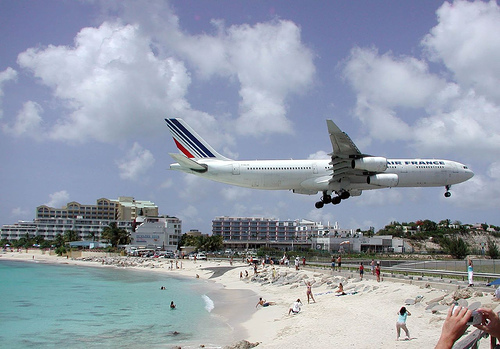
Air France Airbus A340 landing at Princess Juliana International Airport

Public buses are the primary mode of transportation for visitors staying on the island.

=== Border checks ===
Neither side of the island is part of the Schengen Area; full border checks are performed when travelling in and out of the island. Passport controls are also exercised when taking the ferry from Marigot or Princess Juliana International Airport to Anguilla. There are rarely checks at the border between the two sides of the island.

In 1994, the Kingdom of the Netherlands and France signed the Franco-Dutch treaty on Saint Martin border controls, which allows for joint Franco-Dutch border controls on so-called "risk flights" arriving from off-island and only admitting foreigners having permission to travel on both sides of the island. After some delay, the treaty was ratified in November 2006 in the Netherlands and subsequently entered into force on 1 August 2007. Its provisions are not yet implemented as the working group specified in the treaty is not yet installed. The Dutch side has expressed concern that new and tighter French visa requirements would harm their tourism income.

=== Airports ===
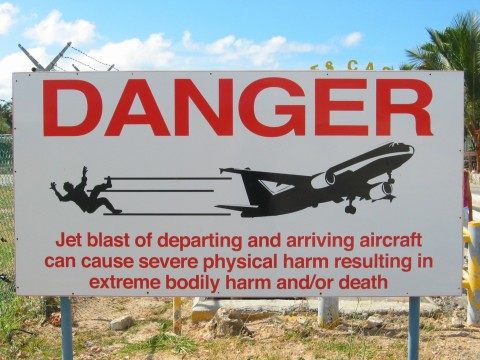
Sign warning people standing too close to the airport fence on Maho Beach.

The island is served by the Princess Juliana International Airport, in the Dutch part of the island.

There is also a small airport on the French side of the island at Grand Case, L'Espérance Airport for small aircraft serving neighbouring Caribbean islands.

== See also ==
- Caribbean Netherlands
- List of Sint Maarten leaders of government
- Outline of Saint Martin
- Overseas France
- Scouting and Guiding in Guadeloupe and Saint Martin
