= Franco-Dutch treaty on Saint Martin border controls =

1994 treaty between France and the Netherlands

Treaty between the Kingdom of the Netherlands and the French Republic on the control of persons entering Saint Martin through the airports. Traité entre le Royaume des Pays-Bas et la République française sur le contrôle des personnes entrant dans Saint Martin sur les aéroports. Verdrag tussen het Koninkrijk der Nederlanden en de Franse Republiek inzake personencontrole op de luchthavens op Sint Maarten.
- Signed: 17 May 1994
- Location: Paris, France
- Effective: 1 August 2007
- Signatories: France; Netherlands
- Languages: French and Dutch

The Franco-Dutch treaty on Saint Martin border controls, sometimes shortened to the Franco-Dutch treaty and in full the Treaty between the Kingdom of the Netherlands and the French Republic on the control of persons entering Saint Martin through the airports (French: Traité entre le Royaume des Pays-Bas et la République française sur le contrôle des personnes entrant dans Saint Martin sur les aéroports; Dutch: Verdrag tussen het Koninkrijk der Nederlanden en de Franse Republiek inzake personencontrole op de luchthavens op Sint Maarten), is a treaty between France and the Netherlands aimed at improving border controls at the two airports on the divided island of Saint Martin. The island is divided into French Saint-Martin (at the time a part of Guadeloupe) and Dutch Sint Maarten (at the time a part of the Netherlands Antilles).

The airports concerned are Princess Juliana International Airport and L'Espérance Airport. Implementation has been delayed for several years by the government of Sint Maarten.

== History ==
The treaty was signed on 17 May 1994 in Paris, and is drawn up in both a French and Dutch original.

=== Ratification ===
Ratification proved to be difficult in the Netherlands. An advice from the Estates of the Netherlands Antilles, which said that the treaty would have negative effects on Sint Maarten's tourist industry, initially blocked the ratification. There had also been objections about the authority of the committee (see below). The parliament of the Kingdom of the Netherlands decided in 1999 to hold off ratification until Sint Maarten made its position clear. Sint Maarten's position was never made clear, however. After France put pressure on the Dutch government, the treaty was eventually ratified in 2006, much to the dismay of the leader of the People's Progressive Alliance.

Signatory	Conclusion date	Institution	In favour	Against	AB	Entry into force	Ref.
Netherlands	14 September 2006	House of Representatives	130	0	0	1 August 2007	
Netherlands	17 October 2006	Senate	66	0	0	1 August 2007	
Netherlands	20 October 2006	Royal Assent	Granted			1 August 2007	
France	13 July 1995	National Assembly	?	?	?	1 August 2007	
France	21 July 1995	Senate	?	?	?	1 August 2007	
France	27 July 1995	Presidential Assent	Granted			1 August 2007	

=== Entry into force and implementation ===
Article 18 specifies that the treaty enters into force on the first day of the third month following a written declaration of both parties that the constitutional ratification procedure has been completed. The treaty entered into force on 1 August 2007.

The treaty had yet to be implemented as of early 2016. The Sint Maarten government reported in January 2016 that a joint committee had been meeting, and that there was "steady progress" toward its implementation.

== Provisions ==
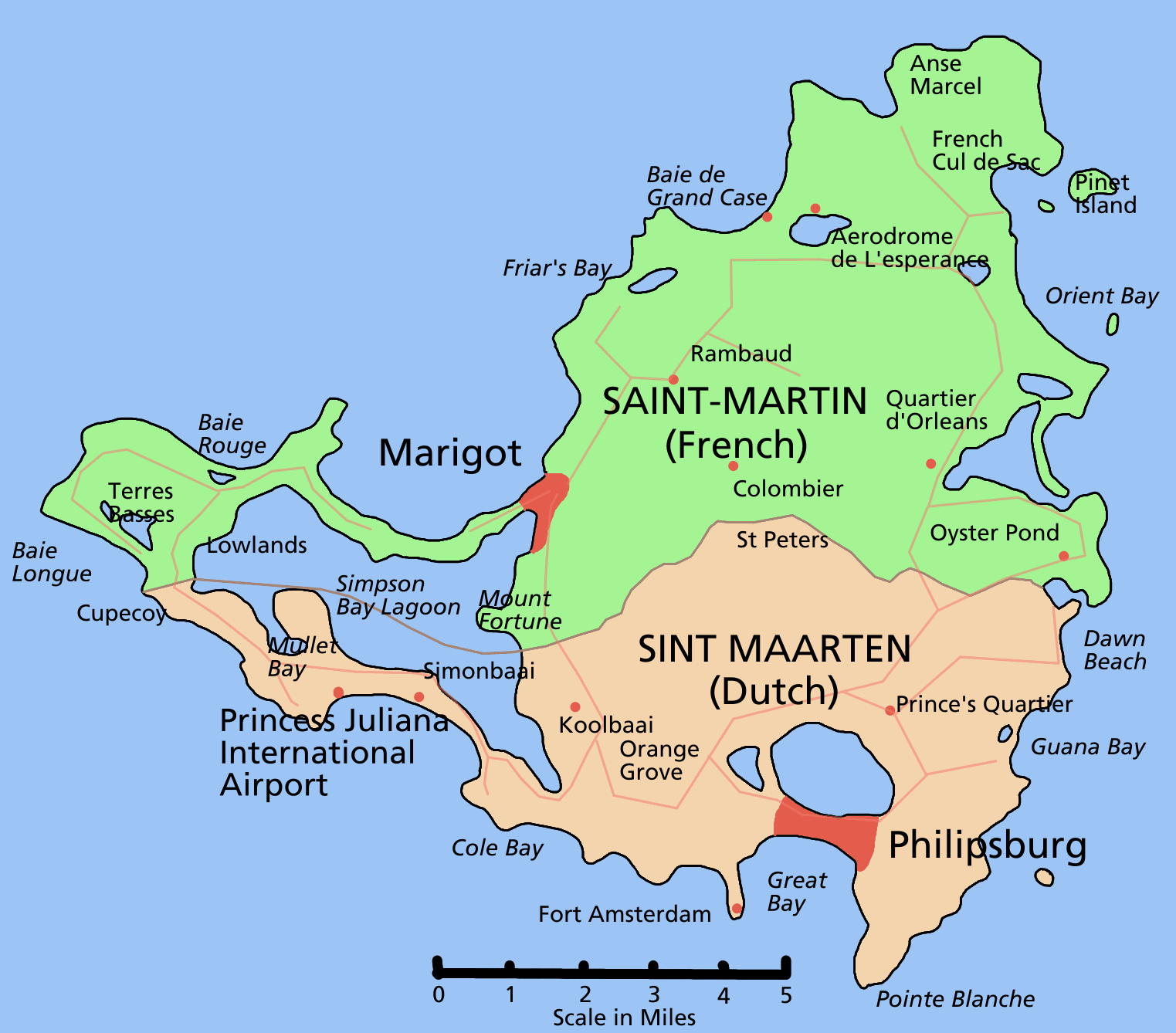
Saint Martin is divided in a French and a Dutch part.

The treaty allows for joint border controls to be carried out at the airports of Saint Martin. The treaty specifies that for admittance to Saint Martin, an alien must have a visa (or a landing permit) for both the Dutch side and the French side. This has caused some controversy on the Dutch side, as that part has a more relaxed visa regime. The French part is an outermost region of the European Union and thus uses its visa list.

Originally, this caused nationals from thirteen countries in the Caribbean region to require visa to land on Princess Juliana Airport which they did not require before. After negotiations, France agreed to limit the additional visa requirements to four countries in the region: Dominica, Jamaica, Guyana and Suriname. There are negotiations to remove Suriname from the list as well.

Joint border controls will be executed at risk flights at both airports. The committee and the working group that have been established by article 13 will draw up a list of flights to be subjected to joint border control. Both the committee and the working group are composed of representatives from both sides and meet once a year.

Implementation is held back by Sint Maarten, whose Prime Minister Sarah Wescot-Williams said that implementation will harm tourist interests. The treaty was to be implemented on 1 April 2009, but it was postponed as the working group was still not installed.

== See also ==
- France–Netherlands border
- Treaty of Concordia
- Visa policy in the European Union
- Visa policy of the Kingdom of the Netherlands in the Caribbean
