= Sint Maarten =

Island country within the Kingdom of the Netherlands

- Constituent country in the Kingdom of the Netherlands
- Country of Sint Maarten; Land Sint Maarten (Dutch)
- Flag Coat of arms
- Motto: "Semper progrediens" (Latin) (English: "Always progressing")
- Anthem: "O Sweet Saint Martin's Land"
- Royal anthem: "Wilhelmus" (English: "William of Nassau")
- Location of Sint Maarten in North America

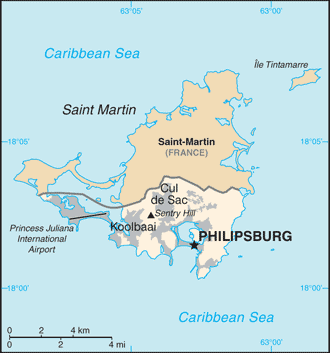
- Sint Maarten is located on the southern half of the island of Saint Martin.
- Sovereign state: Kingdom of the Netherlands
- Before separation: Netherlands Antilles
- Country status: 10 October 2010
- Capital: Philipsburg; 18°1′26″N 63°2′45″W
- Largest city: Lower Prince's Quarter
- Official languages: English; Dutch
- Religion: 82.18% Christianity; 33.13% Roman Catholic; 49.05% Protestant; 14.74% Pentecostal; 9.96% Methodist; 6.62% Seventh-day Adventist; 4.72% Baptist; 3.06% Anglican; 1.7% Jehovah's Witnesses; 6.89% Other Christian; 7.9% No religion; 5.2% Hinduism; 2.37% Not stated; 0.8% Other
- Demonym(s): Sint Maartener
- Government: Parliamentary representative democracy within a constitutional monarchy
  - Monarch: Willem-Alexander
  - Governor: Ajamu Baly
  - Prime Minister: Luc Mercelina
- Legislature: Parliament of Sint Maarten

Area
  - Total: 34 km^{2} (13 sq mi) (191st)
- Highest elevation: 383 m (1,257 ft)

Population
  - 2023 estimate: 58,477 (187th)
  - Density: 1,221/km^{2} (3,162.4/sq mi) (11th)
- GDP (PPP): 2018 estimate
  - Total: $1.436 billion
  - Per capita: $35,342
- GDP (nominal): 2025 estimate
  - Total: US$1.89 billion
  - Per capita: US$42,978
- Currency: Caribbean guilder (XCG) official; United States dollar (USD) and Euro (EUR) also widely used
- Time zone: UTC−4:00 (AST)
- Mains electricity: 120 V–60 Hz
- Driving side: Right
- Calling code: +1
- ISO 3166 code: SX; NL-SX
- Internet TLD: .sx

Sint Maarten, (Note: Dutch pronunciation: [sɪntˈmaːrtə(n)]; Spanish: San Martín, French: Saint-Martin) officially the Country of Sint Maarten, (Note: Dutch: Land Sint Maarten) is a constituent country of the Kingdom of the Netherlands located in the Caribbean region of North America. With a population of 58,477 as of June 2023 on an area of 34 km^{2} (13 sq mi), it encompasses the southern 44% of the divided island of Saint Martin, while the northern 56% of the island constitutes the French overseas collectivity of Saint Martin. Sint Maarten's capital is Philipsburg. Collectively, Sint Maarten and the other Dutch islands in the Caribbean are often called the Dutch Caribbean.

Before 10 October 2010, Sint Maarten was known as the Island Territory of Sint Maarten (Dutch: Eilandgebied Sint Maarten), and was one of six (and from 1986 onwards, five) island territories (eilandgebieden) that constituted the Netherlands Antilles. Sint Maarten has the status of an EU overseas country; it is not part of the European Union, but is a member of the Overseas Countries and Territories Association.

On 6 and 7 September 2017, the island was hit by Category 5 Hurricane Irma, which caused widespread and significant damage to buildings and infrastructure.

== Etymology ==
Due to confusion on early maps, the island was accidentally confused with Nevis and given the name Christopher Columbus had originally given that island in honor of Saint Martin of Tours, when he first sighted Nevis on the saint's feast day on 11 November 1493.

"Sint Maarten" is Saint Martin in Dutch.

== History ==
=== Pre-colonial ===
Sint Maarten had been inhabited by the Indigenous peoples for many centuries, with archaeological finds pointing to a human presence on the island as early as 2000 BC. These people most likely migrated from South America. The earliest identified group were the Arawak people who are thought to have settled around the period 800 BC – 300 BC. Circa 1300–1400 AD they began to be displaced with the arrival of the Kalinago people.

=== Arrival of Europeans ===
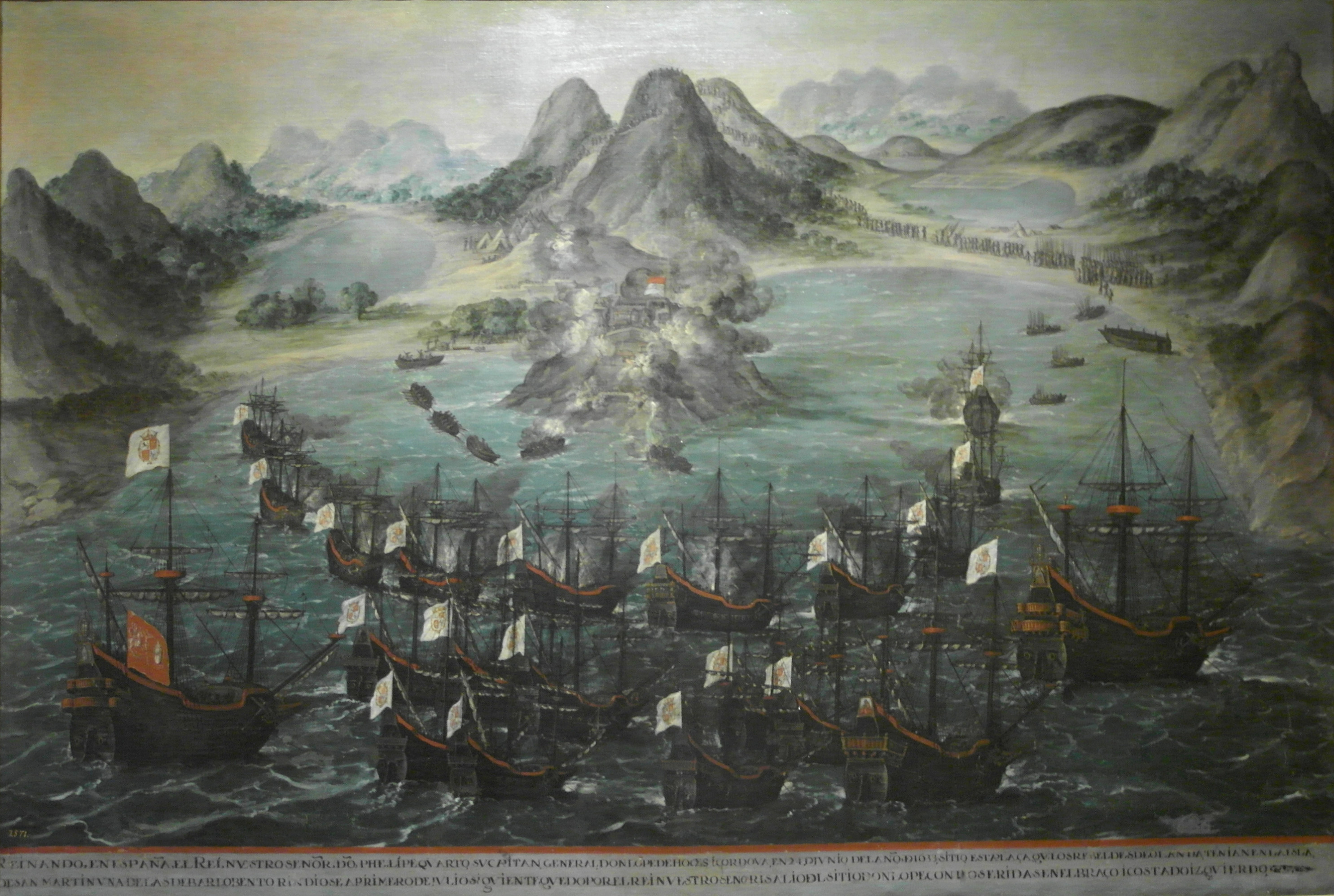
The 1633 Spanish capture of Saint Martin, as painted by Juan de la Corte

It is commonly believed that Christopher Columbus named the island in honor of Saint Martin of Tours when he encountered it on his second voyage of discovery. However, he actually applied the name to the island now called Nevis when he anchored offshore on 11 November 1493, the feast day of Saint Martin. The confusion of numerous poorly charted small islands in the Leeward Islands meant that this name was accidentally transferred to the island now known as Saint-Martin/Sint Maarten.

Nominally Spanish territory, the island became the focus of the competing interests of the European powers, notably the French and Dutch. While the French wanted to colonize the islands between Trinidad and Bermuda, the Dutch found San Martín a convenient halfway point between their colonies in New Amsterdam (present day New York) and New Holland. Meanwhile, the Amerindian population began to decline precipitously, dying from introduced diseases to which they had no immunity.

The Dutch built a fort (Fort Amsterdam) on the island in 1631; Jan Claeszen van Campen became its first governor and the Dutch West India Company began mining salt on the island. Tensions between the Netherlands and Spain were already high due to the ongoing Eighty Years' War, and in 1633 the Spanish captured St. Martin and drove off the Dutch colonists. At Point Blanche, they built what is now Old Spanish Fort to secure the territory. The Dutch under Peter Stuyvesant attempted to wrest back control in 1644, but were repulsed. However, in 1648 the Eighty Years' War ended and the Spanish, no longer seeing any strategic or economic value in the island, simply abandoned it.

With Saint Martin free again, both the Dutch and the French jumped at the chance to re-establish their settlements. Dutch colonists came from St. Eustatius, while the French came from St. Kitts. After some initial conflict, both sides realized that neither would yield easily. Preferring to avoid an all-out war, they signed the Treaty of Concordia in 1648, which divided the island in two. During the treaty's negotiation, the French had a fleet of naval ships off shore, which they used as a threat to bargain more land for themselves. In spite of the treaty, relations between the two sides were not always cordial. Between 1648 and 1816, conflicts changed the border sixteen times. The entire island came under effective French control from 1795 when Netherlands became a puppet state under the French Empire until 1815. In the end, the French came out ahead with 53 km^{2} (20 sq mi; 61%) against 34 km^{2} (13 sq mi; 39%) on the Dutch side.

=== 18th–19th centuries ===
To work the new cotton, tobacco, and sugarcane plantations, the French and Dutch began importing large numbers of African slaves, who soon came to outnumber the Europeans. The slave population quickly grew larger than that of the land owners. Subjected to cruel treatment, slaves staged rebellions, and their overwhelming numbers made it impossible to ignore their concerns. In 1848, the French abolished slavery in their colonies including the French side of St. Martin. Slaves on the Dutch side of the island protested and threatened to flee to the French side to seek asylum. The local Dutch authorities then freed the colonies' slaves. While this decree was respected locally, it was not until 1863 when the Dutch abolished slavery in all of their island colonies that the slaves became legally free.

=== 20th century ===
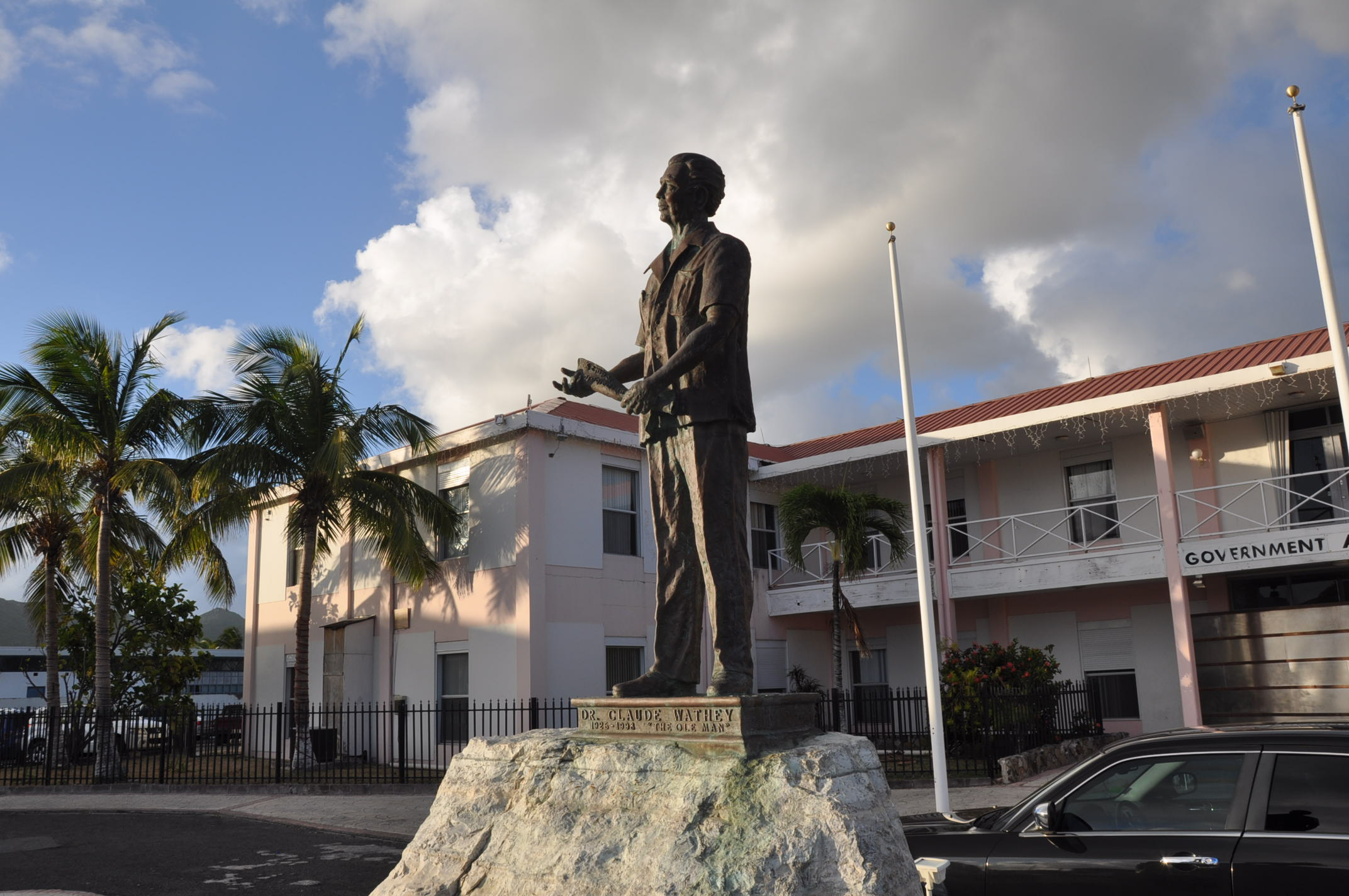
Statue of Claude Wathey in Philipsburg

After the abolition of slavery, plantation culture declined and the island's economy suffered. In 1939, Sint Maarten received a major boost when it was declared a duty-free port. In 1941, the island was shelled by a German U-boat as part of the Battle of the Atlantic.

Tourism began growing from the 1950s onward, and Princess Juliana International Airport became one of the busiest in the Eastern Caribbean. For much of this period, Sint Maarten was governed by business tycoon Claude Wathey of the Democratic Party. The island's demographics changed dramatically during this period as well, with the population increasing from a mere 5,000 people to around 60,000 people by the mid-1990s. Immigration from the neighbouring Lesser Antilles, Curaçao, Haiti, the Dominican Republic, the United States, Europe, and Asia turned the native population into a minority.

Sint Maarten became an "island territory" (eilandgebied in Dutch) of the Netherlands Antilles in 1983. Before that date, Sint Maarten was part of the island territory of the Windward Islands, together with Saba and Sint Eustatius. The status of an island territory entails considerable autonomy summed up in the Island Regulation of the Netherlands Antilles. During this period Sint Maarten was ruled by an island council, an executive council, and a lieutenant governor (Dutch: gezaghebber) appointed by the Dutch Crown.

Hurricane Luis in late August and early September 1995 hit the island, causing immense destruction and resulting in 12 deaths.

=== 21st century ===
In 1994, the Kingdom of the Netherlands and France had signed the Franco-Dutch treaty on Saint Martin border controls, which allows for joint Franco-Dutch border controls on so-called "risk flights". After some delay, the treaty was ratified in November 2006 in the Netherlands and subsequently entered into force on 1 August 2007. Though the treaty is now in force, its provisions are not yet implemented as the working group specified in the treaty is not yet installed.

On 10 October 2010 Sint Maarten became a constituent country (Dutch: Land Sint Maarten) within the Kingdom of the Netherlands, making it a constitutional equal partner with Aruba, Curaçao, and the Netherlands proper. Constitution Day (10 October) is celebrated annually as a public holiday.

Sint Maarten has been assigned the ISO 3166-1 alpha-2 country codes of SXM and SX, and the .sx Internet ccTLD became available to register on 15 November 2012.

==== Effects of Hurricane Irma ====
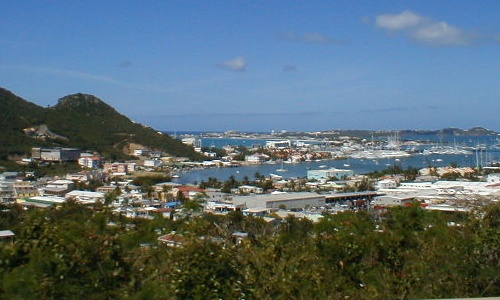
The port in Sint Maarten before Hurricane Irma

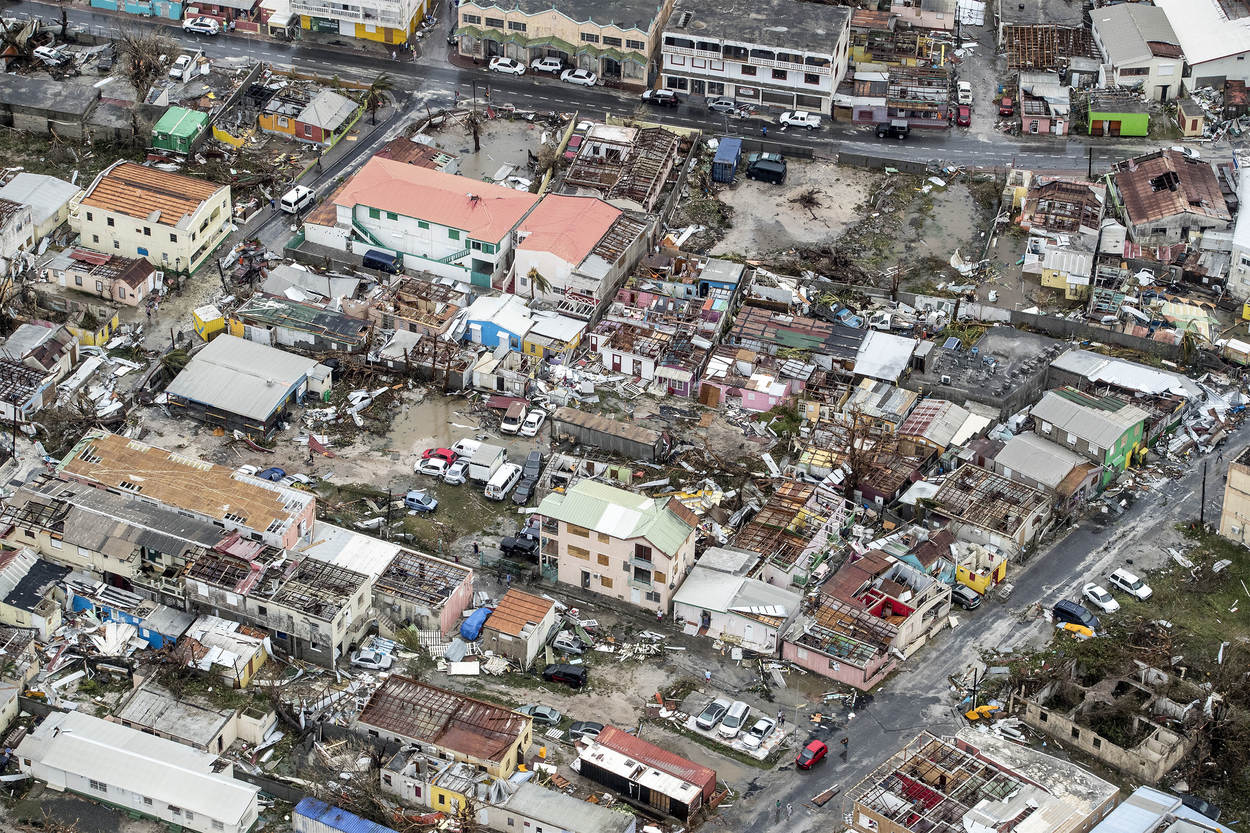
Damaged buildings in the wake of Hurricane Irma

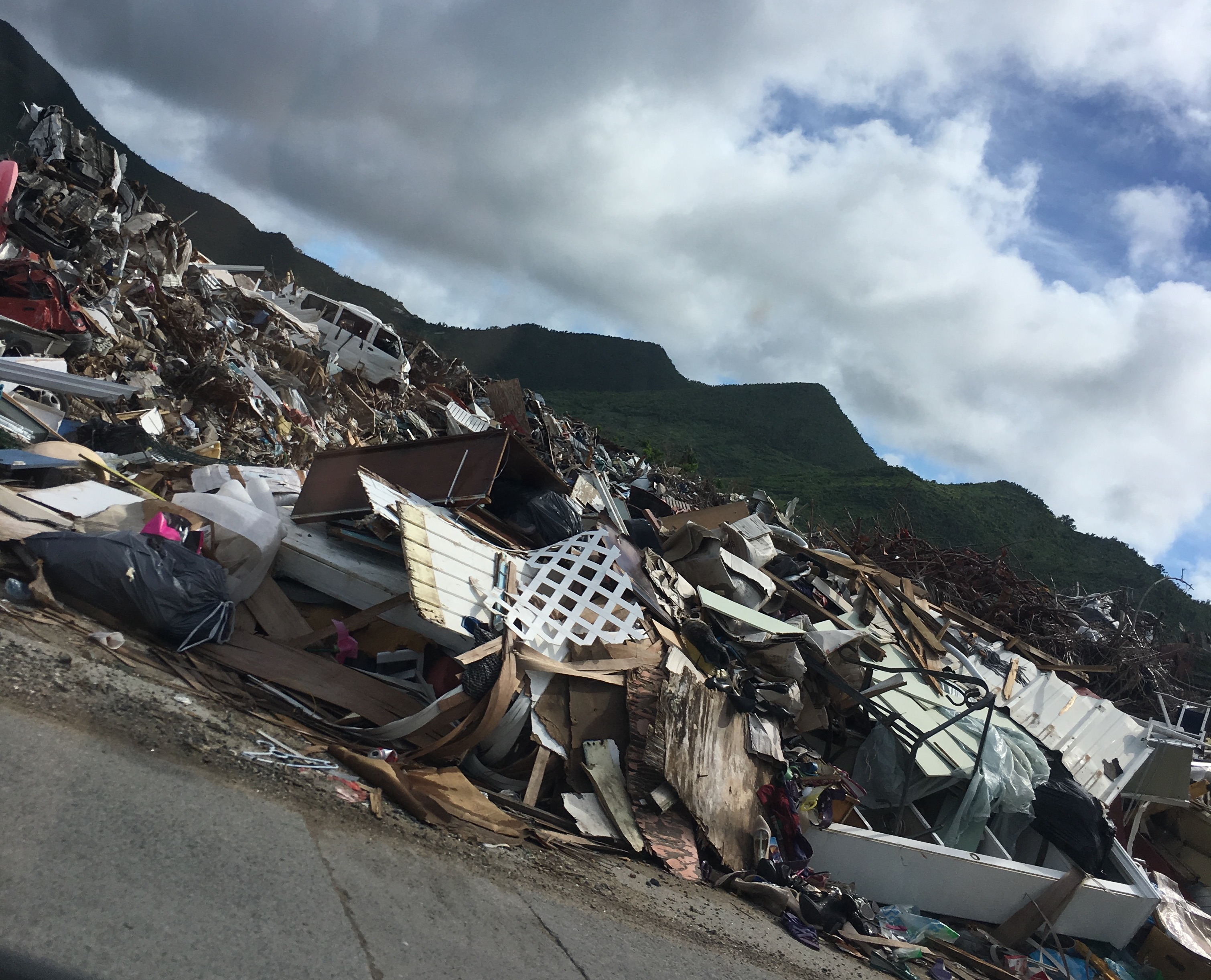
Ground view of Hurricane Irma's damage

Hurricane Irma made landfall on 6 September 2017, causing extensive damage. Four deaths were ultimately reported, and there were 11 serious injuries out of a total of 34. Princess Juliana Airport was extensively damaged but reopened on a partial basis in two days to allow incoming relief flights and for flights to take evacuees to other islands. By 8 September, "many inhabitants [were] devoid of basic necessities" and looting had become a serious problem. Reports on 9 September indicated that 70% of the infrastructure on the Dutch part had been destroyed. A survey by the Dutch Red Cross estimated that nearly a third of the buildings in Sint Maarten had been destroyed and that over 90% of structures on the island had been damaged.

The prime minister of the Netherlands, Mark Rutte, told the news media on 8 September that the airport in Sint Maarten was ready to receive emergency flights and that aid, as well as police officers and military personnel, were on their way. The prime minister of Sint Maarten, William Marlin, had already asked the Dutch government for extended relief assistance which began to arrive on 8 September. The government issued a tropical storm warning on 8 September since the category four Hurricane Jose was approaching.

In the aftermath of the hurricane, the extensive damage led officials to predict dramatic economic impacts. A statement by Marlin summarized the situation on 8 September: "We've lost many, many homes. Schools have been destroyed. We foresee a loss of the tourist season because of the damage that was done to hotel properties, the negative publicity that one would have that it's better to go somewhere else because it's destroyed. So that will have a serious impact on our economy." At the time, preparations were being made as Hurricane Jose approached the island. The government estimated that on 9 September 70% of houses were badly damaged or destroyed and much of the population was living in shelters ahead of the arrival of Jose. Fortunately, this second hurricane did not have a significant impact on the island.

Widespread looting and violence erupted in the wake of the recovery, and a state of emergency was announced. Two hundred and thirty soldiers from the Netherlands were sent in to stabilize the situation, with additional troops arriving in the coming days. By 10 September, approximately 1,200 Americans had been evacuated to Puerto Rico by military aircraft. On that date, Royal Caribbean International said that the company was sending its Adventure of the Seas to Sint Maarten and to St. Thomas to provide supplies and to offer evacuation services. The ship arrived on the island on 10 September with water, ice, garbage bags, clothing, and canned food, and evacuated 320 people. By 11 September, King Willem-Alexander had already arrived in Curaçao and was scheduled to visit Sint Maarten, St. Eustatius, and Saba. When Willem-Alexander visited Sint Maarten for the first time post-hurricane, he was shocked by the destruction. He immediately called for support from the European Union so the island could recover swiftly. Later in the month, it was revealed that the EU would allocate €2 billion in emergency funds for immediate disaster relief to restore basic essentials on Sint Maarten, such as drinking water and sanitation. In addition to the EU's contribution, Red Cross, the government of the Netherlands, and Dutch citizens of the mainland raised money via donations and crowdfunding for the recovery efforts.

==== Post-hurricane rebuilding ====
On 10 October 2017, Princess Juliana International Airport re-commenced commercial flights using temporary structures, pending repairs.

A report in late March 2018 indicated that the airport was able to handle some flights and some service had resumed from the US, Canada, and Europe. A new departure lounge was being used during rebuilding of the original facility. The General Aviation building was being used for passengers arriving on the island.

A little over a year after Hurricane Irma, St Maarten's cruise industry had recovered to the extent that in 2018, more than 1 million cruise passengers visited the island.

Telecommunications, including Wi-Fi, had been restored on the island, 95% of customers were receiving electricity and drinking water was readily available on the island. Some tourist accommodations were open, with 27 operating and 36 said to be ready sometime later in 2018. Cruise ships were arriving in 2018.

The Sint Maarten Reconstruction, Recovery and Resilience Trust Fund was officially extended to December 2028 (Major projects including reconstruction of the airport were largely completed in 2024).

==== Political instability and snap elections ====
Following the January 2024 elections, the coalition government collapsed shortly after forming. This led to snap elections in August 2024, which eventually resulted in the administration of Prime Minister Luc Mercelina.

== Geography ==
Detailed map showing Sint Maarten

Sint Maarten occupies the southern part of the island of Saint Martin in the Leeward Islands; the northern half forms the French territory of Saint Martin. To the north across the Anguilla Channel lies the British Overseas Territory of Anguilla, to the south-east of the island lies the French island of Saint Barthélemy, and further south are the Dutch islands of Saba and Sint Eustatius.

Sint Maarten is 34 km^{2} (13 sq mi). The terrain is generally hilly, with the highest peak being Mount Flagstaff at 383m, which lies directly on the island's international border. The area to the west around the airport is flatter, and contains the Dutch section of the Simpson Bay Lagoon. The Great Salt Pond lies to north of Philipsburg. Several small islands lie off the coast. Little Key lies in the Simpson Bay Lagoon.

There are ten total islands in Sint Maarten, including:

- Saint Martin (southern part), 18°02′30″N 63°04′00″W
- Cow and Calf Island, 18°01′22″N 63°00′44″W
- Guana Key of Pelikan, 18°01′05″N 63°01′09″W
- Hen and Chicken, 18°N 63°W
- Little Key, 18°03′02″N 63°06′35″W
- Molly Beday, 18°01′19″N 62°59′57″W
- Mona Island, 18°02′00″N 63°07′00″W
- Pelikan Key, 18°01′49″N 63°05′54″W
- Pond Island, 18°01′52″N 63°02′41″W
- Snoopy Island, 18°02′10″N 63°05′27″W

=== Climate ===
Sint Maarten has a tropical savanna climate (Köppen Aw), and is drier than most parts of the northeastern Caribbean because of a rain shadow from the island's mountains, drying the trade winds. The driest months are from January to July, and the wettest from September to November, when hurricanes can strike the island.

Climate data for Philipsburg, Sint Maarten (Princess Juliana Airport) 1971–2000
Month	Jan	Feb	Mar	Apr	May	Jun	Jul	Aug	Sep	Oct	Nov	Dec	Year
Record high °C (°F)	32.7 (90.9)	31.6 (88.9)	32.6 (90.7)	33.6 (92.5)	33.5 (92.3)	33.9 (93.0)	34.2 (93.6)	35.1 (95.2)	34.8 (94.6)	34.3 (93.7)	33.9 (93.0)	32.1 (89.8)	35.1 (95.2)
Mean daily maximum °C (°F)	28.6 (83.5)	28.7 (83.7)	29.2 (84.6)	29.8 (85.6)	30.4 (86.7)	31.3 (88.3)	31.6 (88.9)	31.7 (89.1)	31.6 (88.9)	31.2 (88.2)	30.2 (86.4)	29.2 (84.6)	30.3 (86.5)
Daily mean °C (°F)	25.5 (77.9)	25.4 (77.7)	25.7 (78.3)	26.5 (79.7)	27.4 (81.3)	28.2 (82.8)	28.3 (82.9)	28.6 (83.5)	28.5 (83.3)	28.2 (82.8)	27.3 (81.1)	26.1 (79.0)	27.2 (81.0)
Mean daily minimum °C (°F)	23.2 (73.8)	23.1 (73.6)	23.5 (74.3)	24.1 (75.4)	25.1 (77.2)	25.2 (77.4)	26.1 (79.0)	26.2 (79.2)	26.0 (78.8)	25.7 (78.3)	24.9 (76.8)	23.9 (75.0)	24.8 (76.6)
Record low °C (°F)	18.6 (65.5)	19.2 (66.6)	19.5 (67.1)	19.3 (66.7)	20.2 (68.4)	22.3 (72.1)	22.1 (71.8)	21.4 (70.5)	22.0 (71.6)	22.1 (71.8)	21.2 (70.2)	20.0 (68.0)	18.6 (65.5)
Average rainfall mm (inches)	66.0 (2.60)	50.7 (2.00)	45.2 (1.78)	64.0 (2.52)	93.3 (3.67)	61.8 (2.43)	71.6 (2.82)	98.8 (3.89)	139.6 (5.50)	113.0 (4.45)	149.3 (5.88)	93.8 (3.69)	1,047.1 (41.22)
Average rainy days (≥ 1.0 mm)	11.9	9.3	9.0	11.8	10.3	8.4	12.2	13.9	13.5	13.8	14.8	13.3	142.0
Average relative humidity (%)	74.7	74.1	73.6	75.0	75.9	75.1	74.8	75.4	76.3	76.8	77.4	76.6	75.5
Mean monthly sunshine hours	257.2	235.2	271.6	265.4	251.0	245.1	257.2	288.1	232.4	244.6	235.0	246.7	3,009.4
Percentage possible sunshine	73.5	72.7	72.2	70.6	62.4	62.0	63.2	67.7	62.8	67.0	68.3	71.4	67.8
Source: Meteorological Department Curaçao

== Government and politics ==
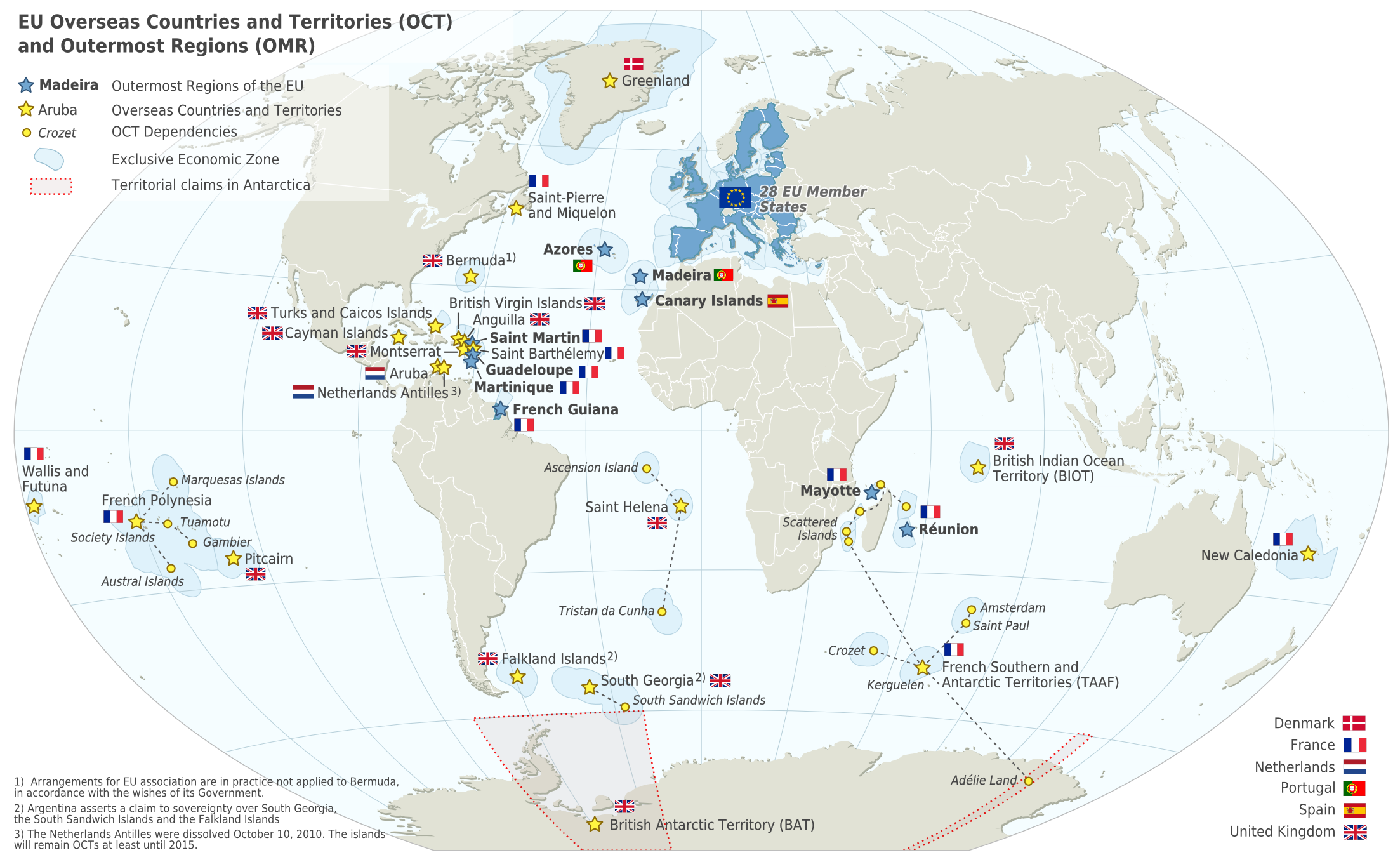
The European Union and the UK (prior to the latter's departure) in the world with overseas countries and territories and outermost regions

=== Status within the Kingdom of the Netherlands ===
Sint Maarten is a constituent country of the Kingdom of the Netherlands, and as such the monarch of the Netherlands is head of state, represented locally by a governor. Following the dissolution of the Netherlands Antilles, the Constitution of Sint Maarten was unanimously adopted by the island council of Sint Maarten on 21 July 2010. Elections for a new island council were held on 17 September 2010, since the number of seats was increased from 11 to 15. The newly elected island council became the Estates of Sint Maarten on 10 October. Sint Maarten is largely autonomous in internal affairs, with the Netherlands responsible for foreign diplomacy and defence. The first woman to be the prime minister of Sint Maarten was Gracita Arrindell, who was first elected in 2010.

There currently is a movement in Sint Maarten aiming for the unification of island of Saint Martin, which has its own flag.

Since 2020, the relationship between the 2 has been defined by the Landspakket (structural reform in exchange for COVID-19 support). These reforms cover financial management, health care, and the labor market.

=== Relation to the European Union ===
Sint Maarten is classified as an Overseas Country and Territory (OCT) in Annex II of the Treaty on the Functioning of the European Union (TFEU). This annex lists all the territories that have special relationships with the European Union due to their connection with EU member states but are not part of the Union itself.

Being classified as an OCT Sint Maarten is not part of the European Union. The status of Sint Maarten is outlined in Article 355(2) in conjunction with Part Four —Articles 198 to 204— of the TFEU. Key points include:

- Article 198 states that the European Union maintains special relationships with the OCTs, which are under the sovereignty of EU member states but are not part of the EU.
- Article 199 specifies that these OCTs have a special status, meaning they are not part of the EU's internal market or customs union but benefit from special cooperation and development aid.

This classification means that while Sint Maarten benefits from economic and developmental cooperation with the EU, it does not participate in EU institutions or policies as full member states do.

=== Foreign policy and defence ===
The Kingdom of the Netherlands has overarching responsibility for foreign relations, defence and Dutch nationality law in the Caribbean parts of the Kingdom. A detachment of the Royal Netherlands Marine Corps is present on Sint Maarten and the Royal Netherlands Navy deploys a guardship, normally a Holland-class offshore patrol vessel, in the Caribbean on a rotational basis together with the support vessel HNLMS Pelikaan which operates out of Curaçao. Additionally, the Dutch Caribbean Coast Guard, directed by the commander of the Royal Netherlands Navy in the Caribbean, operates throughout the Caribbean and is funded by the four constituent countries of the Kingdom.

=== Environmental laws ===
The beach policy (as of 1994) views the beach from the perspective of being an ecosystem service for recreational activities. This is because the economy on Sint Maarten is tourism-driven, and many tourists come to the island to enjoy the 37 beaches on the island. The policy has three main points: the beach must be usable for everyone, developments negatively affecting recreational use will be prevented, and beaches should be protected against human influences that could impair their recreational function. The policy's main purpose is to protect the recreational value of the beach. The laws do not consider the protection and ecological value of this habitat in regard to protecting nesting sea turtles, preserving the beach line, or preserving the plants that live in and along the beach line.

The hillside policy, as of 1998, is mainly concerned with residential development. On the hillside, only residential development is permitted, certain hillsides with important "visual impact" are protected and conserved for their general landscape. A natural park is projected for the following hills: Cole Bay Hill, Sentry Hill, St. Peters Hill, Concordia Hill, Marigot Hill, Waymouth Hill, and Williams Hill. The policy stated the main objective was to conserve and maintain the green hillside and restore any natural habitats if needed. However, as of 2020, these natural parks had not yet been established.

=== Corruption ===
In 1978, the government of the Netherlands Antilles installed a Research Committee on the Windward Islands (Dutch: Commissie van Onderzoek Bovenwindse Eilanden) to investigate claims of corruption in the island government. Even though the report issued by this commission was damaging for the island's government, measures were not put into place to curb corruption, arguably because the government of the Netherlands Antilles depended on the support of Wathey's Democratic Party in the Estates of the Netherlands Antilles. In August 1990, the public prosecutor of the Netherlands Antilles started an investigation into the alleged ties between the island government of Sint Maarten and the Sicilian Mafia, and in 1991 the Court of Audit of the Netherlands Antilles issued a report which concluded that the island government of Sint Maarten was ailing.

In the government and parliament of the Netherlands, the call for measures became louder. With Dutch pressure, the government of the Netherlands Antilles installed the Pourier Commission tasked with investigating the state of affairs of the island government of Sint Maarten in December 1991. Its report concluded that the island was in a severe financial crisis, that rules of democratic decision-making were continuously broken, and that the island government constituted an oligarchy. In short, the island government failed completely according to the report. After long negotiations, the Kingdom government enacted a General Measure of Kingdom Administration (Dutch: Algemene Maatregel van Rijksbestuur) in early 1993, placing Sint Maarten under direct supervision of the Kingdom. Although originally meant for one year, the Order-in-Council for the Kingdom was eventually extended until 1 March 1996.

Though much has changed since, allegations of criminal activities continue to plague Sint Maarten. In 2004, the Minister of Justice of the Netherlands Antilles asked the Scientific Research and Documentation Centre (Dutch: Wetenschappelijk Onderzoek- en Documentatiecentrum (WODC)) of the Dutch Ministry of Justice to conduct research into organized crime in Sint Maarten. The report concluded that money laundering and cocaine trade are widespread on Sint Maarten. It also alleged that money from the island was used to finance Hamas, its associate Holy Land Foundation, and the Taliban.

In April 2009, former Commissioner Louie Laveist was convicted, and sentenced to an 18-month prison sentence, by the Sint Maarten Court-of-First-Instance, on account of forgery, fraud, and bribery. He was later acquitted of forgery and of fraud by the Common Court of Justice of the Netherlands Antilles and Aruba, but not of bribery.

== Ecology ==
=== Plants ===
Sint Maarten is home to many distinctive plants such as hibiscus, yellow sage (seen on the flag), flamboyant trees, mahogany, and cacti. An estimated 522 wild plants are present, mainly being seed plants and a few ferns. The Calyptranthes boldinghgii and Galactia nummelaria are "island-endemic", and it is suspected that they have already gone extinct. Much of the hilltops are semi-evergreen seasonal forests which are rare in the region.

The categorization of native, introduced, and invasive plant species is not as well documented for the island. Some of the introduced plant species include: manila grass (Zoysia matrella), Spanish bayonet (Yucca aloifolia), Singapore almond (Terminalia catappa), true aloe (Aloe vera). Some of the native species are west Indian holly (Tunera ulmifolia), spiny amaranth (Amaranthus spinosus), bell pepper (Capsium pulcherrima), salt heliotrope (Heliotropium curassavicum), bay rum tree (pimento racemose), and sourbush (pluchea carolinesis). One of the invasive species on the island is crowfoot grass (Dactyloctenium aegyptium).

=== Mullet Pond ===
Mullet Pond, a section of the inland lagoon Simpson Bay Lagoon, is home to 70% of Sint Maarten's mangrove population on the Dutch side of the island. Mangroves are a nursery for many young fish and during hurricane season they provide coastal protection. The area, however, is at risk due to dredging, tourism activities, and the yacht industry on the island.

Mullet Pond became the 55th Ramsar site in 2016 and is therefore protected according to the Ramsar Treaty, a global commitment to protect ecologically significant wetland areas.

=== Challenges ===
The effects of climate change are felt on Sint Maarten. According to the Netherlands Antilles Coral Reef Initiative, the coral reefs were fragmented due to a temperature rise to 30 °C in 2005. Twenty years ago [when?], the sea grass beds were much larger. Natural disasters (hurricanes), development, and the tourist industry caused a significant decrease over the years. The seagrass beds are important for anchoring the sand in place, as well as for hurricane protection. Without the seagrass bed, sand can be moved easily by a hurricane, resulting in the loss of beaches or sand accumulates in one area, affecting marine life.

== Demographics ==
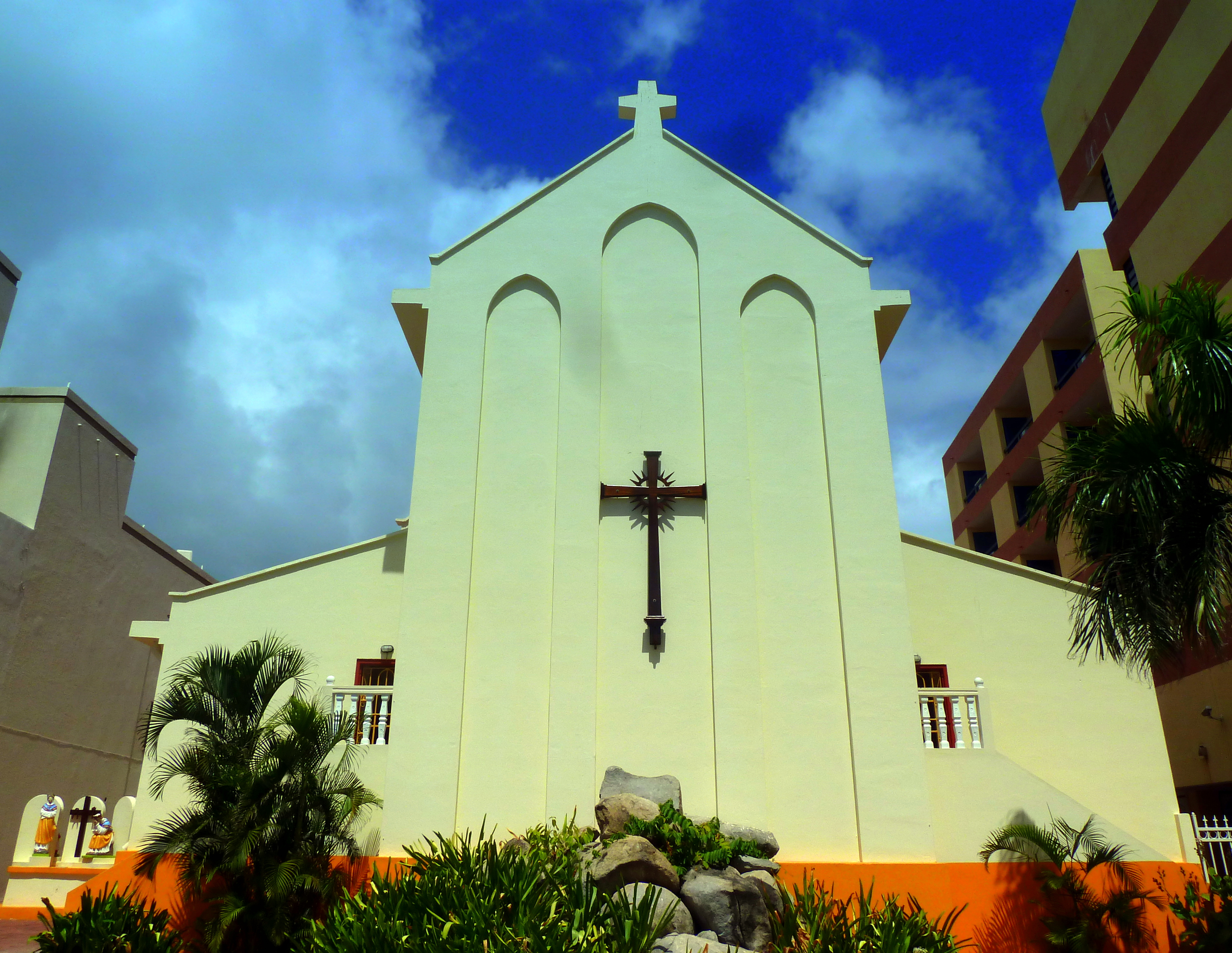
Catholic Church St. Martin of Tours in Philipsburg

In the 2011 Netherlands Antilles census, the population of the island territory was 33,609. In the 2017 census the total population of the country was 40,535. In 2023 a total of 58,477 persons had been registered in the country's Department of Civil Registry.

Sint Maarten's population descends from over 120 nationalities, with over 2/3s of inhabitants being foreign born. By nationality, the population is; Sint Maarten 29.9%, Dominican Republic 10.2%, Haiti 7.8%, Jamaica 6.6%, Saint Martin 5.9%, Guyana 5%, Dominica 4.4%, Curaçao 4.1%, Aruba 3.4%, Saint Kitts and Nevis 2.8%, India 2.6%, Netherlands 2.2%, United States 1.6%, Suriname 1.4%, Saint Lucia 1.3%, Anguilla 1.1%, Other 8%, unspecified 1.7% (2011 est.).

=== Settlements ===
- Philipsburg (1,894 inhabitants)
- Lower Prince's Quarter (10,833 inhabitants)
- Cul de Sac (8,588 inhabitants)
- Cole Bay (7,194 inhabitants)
- Upper Prince's Quarter (4,595 inhabitants)
- Little Bay (Fort Amsterdam) (5,581 inhabitants)
- Simpson Bay (1,142 inhabitants)
- Lowlands (708 inhabitants)

=== Structure of the population ===
Population Estimates by Sex and Age Group (01.I.2018):

Age group	Male	Female	Total	%
Total	19 759	20 855	40 614	100
0–4	1 349	1 265	2 614	6.44
5–9	1 437	1 336	2 773	6.83
10–14	1 387	1 354	2 741	6.75
15–19	1 360	1 361	2 721	6.70
20–24	1 139	1 025	2 165	5.33
25–29	1 142	1 324	2 466	6.07
30–34	1 432	1 651	3 083	7.59
35–39	1 510	1 832	3 342	8.23
40–44	1 651	1 895	3 546	8.73
45–49	1 665	1 806	3 471	8.55
50–54	1 727	1 719	3 446	8.48
55–59	1 348	1 447	2 795	6.88
60–64	1 091	1 132	2 223	5.47
65–69	759	813	1 573	3.87
70–74	431	450	881	2.17
75–79	207	223	430	1.06
80–84	93	125	217	0.53
85–89	18	61	79	0.19
90+	11	36	47	0.12
Age group	Male	Female	Total	Percent
0–14	4 173	3 955	8 128	20.01
15–64	14 067	15 192	29 259	72.04
65+	1 519	1 708	3 227	7.95

=== Religion ===
Religions of Sint Maarten
Religions	percent
Roman Catholic	33.1%
Pentecostal	14.7%
Methodist	10.0%
None	7.9%
Seventh-day Adventist	6.6%
Hindu	5.2%
Christian	4.1%
Baptist	4.7%
Anglican	3.1%
No response	2.4%
Other Protestant	2.8%
Jehovah's Witness	1.7%
Evangelical	1.4%
Other (includes Buddhist, Sikh, Rastafarian)	1.3%
Muslim/Jewish	1.1%

=== Languages ===
First languages of Sint Maarteners (2022)
Languages	percent
English	67.5%
Spanish	12.9%
Creole	8.2%
French	6.6%
Dutch	4.2%
Other	3.5%
Papiamento	1.5%

English is the everyday language of communication in Sint Maarten, and first language of most native born Sint Maarteners. A local variety of Virgin Islands Creole is spoken in informal situations by residents and is the first language of approximately 8.2% of residents as of 2025. Though it holds official status, Dutch is learned by most Sint Maarteners as a second language, and generally used only when communicating with other Dutch speakers.

The government uses Dutch when in communication with the national government and also formerly did so with the Netherlands Antilles government. Local signage uses both Dutch and English. Historically there were English-medium and Dutch-medium schools on Sint Maarten, but Dutch government policy towards St. Maarten and other SSS islands eventually promoted English-medium education.

Sint Maarten is a polyglot society, most are simultaneously bilingual in Dutch and English, and among them are also speakers of Spanish and French, the latter of which is official on the other side of the island (Saint-Martin). Linguist Linda-Andrea Richardson stated in 1983 that Dutch was a "dead language" in Sint Maarten.

Some residents including Arubans, Curaçaoans and Sint Maarteners who have lived on or descend from the ABC Islands, speak Papiamento. Many Spanish speakers are from the Dominican Republic. Dominicans make up the largest group of legal immigrants.

== Economy ==
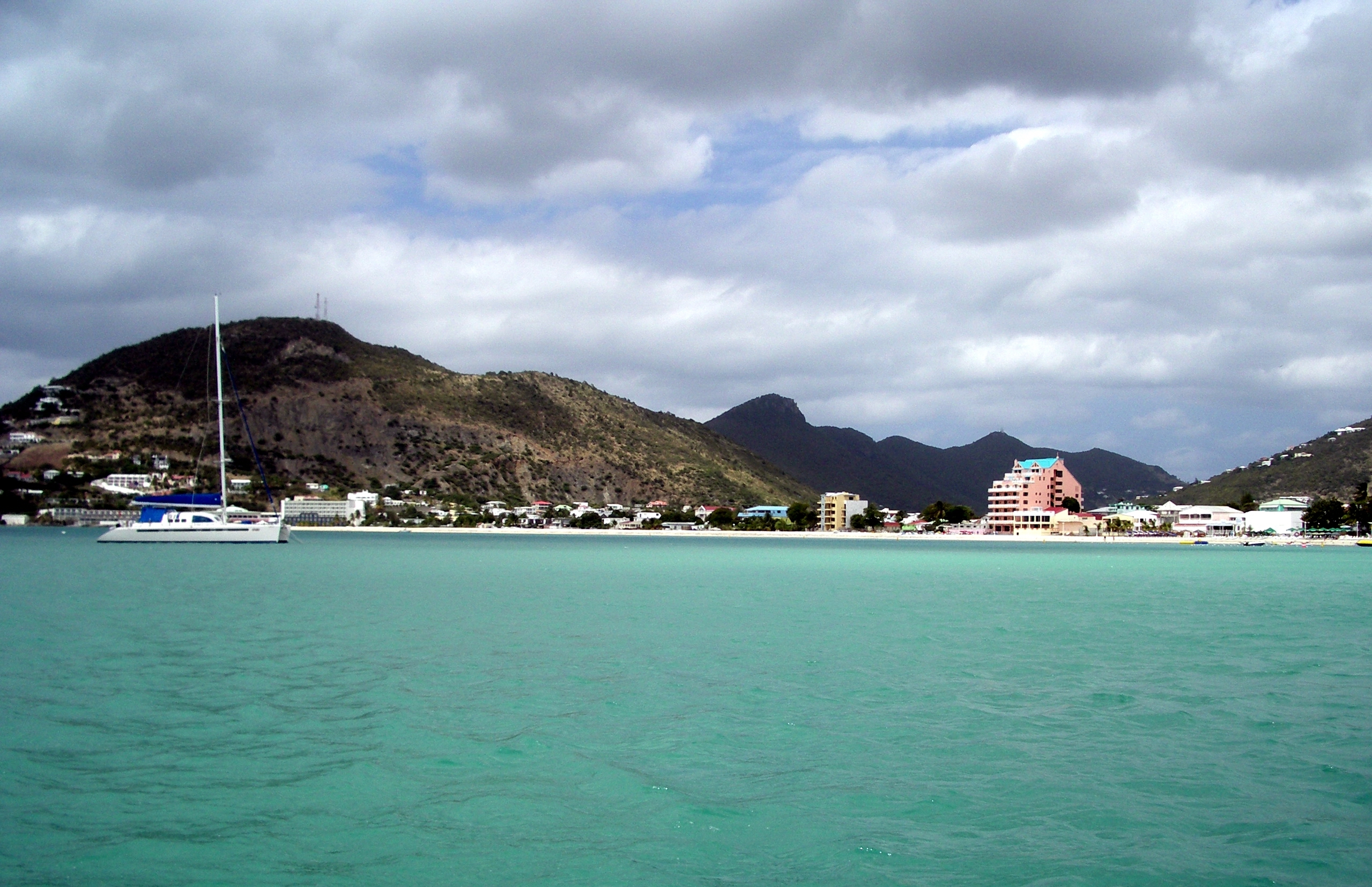
Many tourists come to use Sint Maarten's beaches.

Sint Maarten, along with Curaçao, uses two co-circulating currencies: the Netherlands Antillean guilder and its successor, the Caribbean guilder; the former was formally withdrawn as legal tender and replaced March 31, 2025. The United States dollar is also widely used. The economy is heavily dependent on tourism, either from long-stays or day-trippers from the many cruise lines that dock in the Philipsburg Harbour; around 80% of the workforce is employed in this sector. Some limited agriculture occurs, however most food is imported.

In 2014, St. Maarten had more gaming machines per resident than any other country in the world.

Hurricane Irma severely affected the economy in 2017. In a 2019 report, it was revealed that the island's GDP had dropped by 4.7%, with an increase in inflation. This drastic hit to the economy was due to lessened tourism, real estate, trade, and business activities.

== Culture ==
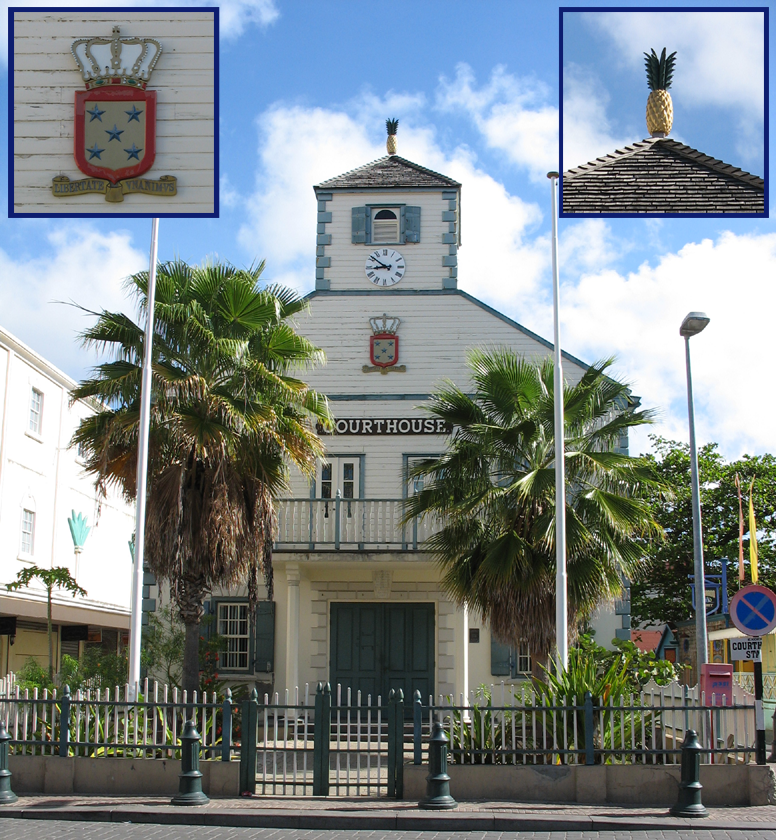
Courthouse on Sint Maarten

Sint Maarten's culture is a mix of African, European and North American influences. Ank Klomp wrote in Saint Martin: Communal Identities on a Divided Caribbean Island that Sint Maarten lacked a Dutch cultural identity.

=== Festivals ===
An annual regatta is held over three days culminating in the first weekend in March. Among the leading cultural artists of the island are Isidore "Mighty Dow" York (kaisonian, panman), Roland Richardson (Impressionist painter), Nicole de Weever (dancer, broadway star), Ruby Bute (painter, storyteller, poet), Clara Reyes (choreographer), Susha Hien (choreographer), Lasana M. Sekou (poet, author, independence advocate), Drisana Deborah Jack (visual artist, poet), and Tanny and The Boys (string band music group). The annual St. Maarten Carnival starts in April and ends in May. The Grand Carnival parade that takes place on the Dutch side is the largest parade of the island's two carnivals. The annual St. Martin Book Fair takes place during the first weekend of June, featuring emerging and famous authors from the island, the Caribbean region, and from around the world.

=== Sport ===
Popular team sports in Sint Maarten include baseball, basketball, volleyball, cricket, and soccer. Recreational fishing, golf, and water sports (including diving, kayaking, snorkelling, dinghy sailing, and yachting) are popular amongst tourists and locals alike.

The Sint Maarten Soccer Association was founded in 1986. The organisation is not a member of FIFA, but became an associate member of CONCACAF in 2002, and a full member in 2013. The national football team debuted in 1989, and plays its home games at the Raoul Illidge Sports Complex, which has a 3,000-spectator capacity. After an initial period of popularity during the 1990s, including an appearance at the 1993 Caribbean Cup, interest in football declined, with the national team playing its last official match in 2000 (against Dominica). However, Sint Maarten returned to international competition in March 2016, for the 2017 Caribbean Cup qualification tournament.

The Sint Maarten Cricket Association is a member of the Leeward Islands Cricket Association (LICA), which is, in turn, a member of Cricket West Indies. With rare exceptions (for instance, the Stanford 20/20), the national cricket team plays only against other LICA members, though Sint Maarteners may go on to play for the Leeward Islands team at regional level and are eligible for both the West Indies and the Netherlands internationally like Kacey Carty was when he made international cricket debut first for the West Indies Under-19 and then ultimately for the West Indies. The primary venue for cricket is the Charles Vlaun Cricket Field. Colin Hamer was the first Sint Maartener to play first-class cricket, while Daniel Doram was the first islander to play at international level, debuting for the Netherlands against Ireland in the Intercontinental Cup in July 2013 at the age of 15, also becoming the first St. Maartener to take a first-class five-wicket haul. In 2016 Kacey Carty became the first St Maartener to play representative cricket for the West Indies (for the West Indies under-19s). Carty was the man of the final at the 2016 Under-19 World Cup, and was later described by the prime minister, William Marlin, as having "brought the name of St Maarten to international acclaim".

Prior to cricket becoming popular, baseball was preferred. No national team existed, although Sint Maarteners were eligible to play for the Netherlands Antilles baseball team before its dissolution. Several Sint Maarteners have passed through the American baseball system, playing at college level or in the minor leagues. Allen Halley played college baseball for the South Alabama Jaguars and was drafted by the Chicago White Sox in the 30th round of the 1995 draft, reaching Class A-Advanced in the minor leagues. Three others, Rene Leveret, Marc Ramirez, Denzel Richardson, and Rafael Skeete, were signed as free agents by major league teams during their careers, but played only in the minor leagues.

Sint Maarten Volleyball Association is part of the Eastern Caribbean Volleyball Association, which hosts championship qualifiers with countries within its zone. Countries that are part of the ECVA are: Anguilla, Antigua, Bermuda, Virgin Islands, Dominica, Dutch Sint.Maarten, French St. Martin, Grenada, Montserrat, Saba, St. Eustatius, St. Kitts, St. Lucia, and St. Vincent & the Grenadines. Over the past 8 years, volleyball in St.Maarten on a National level has been developing and showing results. In 2016, the Sint Maarten Men's National Team went on to win the championship in their pool for the round 1 World Championship Qualifiers winning the gold along with many individual awards. The local awardees were; Nicholas Henrietta (Best Setter); Leonardo J Jeffers (Best Outside Hitter); Stephan Ellis (Best Middle); Allinton Augustine (Best Defence); Riegmar Valies Courtar (Best Opposite), and Riegmar Valies Courtar (Best Scorer) and MVP Most Valuable Player.

=== Popular culture ===
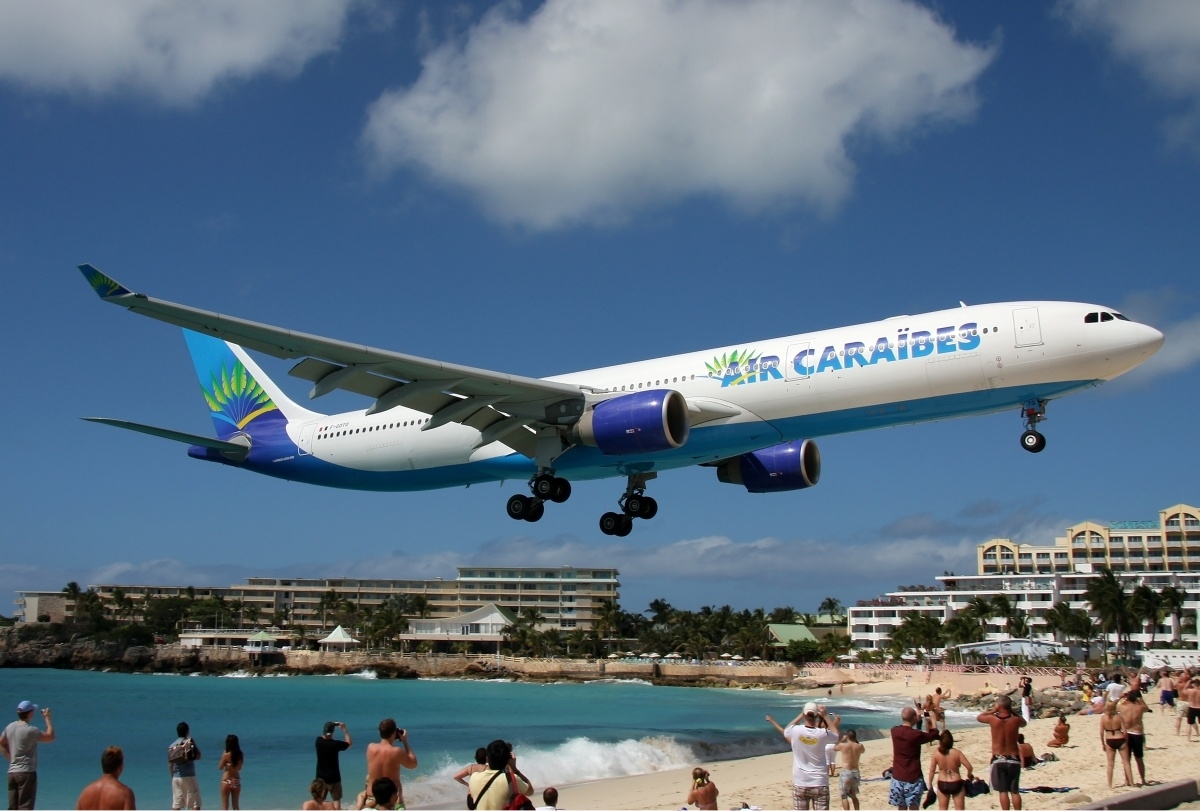
Tourists watch a low flying plane over the beach

The island is famous for its runway at Princess Juliana International Airport, in which landing aircraft pass within 35 metres (38 yd) of Maho Beach below, due to the close proximity of the runway to the ocean. The planes appear to land dangerously close to beach goers so the beach and airport have become a popular place for people to view aeroplane landings. In July 2017, a New Zealander died from head injuries after being propelled backwards from a jet engine blast.

Sint Maarten is also known for its festive nightlife, expansive beaches, precious jewelry, traditional cuisines, and plentiful casinos.

Next to its own cultural icons like painters Ruby Bute and Roland Richardson, the island had various well known foreign artists as frequent visitors. Nobel prize winner Derek Walcott partially derives from a St. Maarten family. Chef Anthony Bourdain had his novel "Gone Bamboo" situated on the island. Romare Bearden spent much time on the island, producing artworks featuring amongst others Orient Bay and Carnival settings.

== Media and telecommunications ==
Sint Maarten's first radio station, the Voice of St. Maarten (PJD-2), was founded on 23 December 1959 and was also heard in neighbouring islands. During its first several years, it employed two announcers and broadcast leased religious programming for most of its daily schedule. Television services were introduced to the territory in May 1963, starting in the Philipsburg area and served by a relay station in the Fort Willem area which received programs from Puerto Rico; the Fort Willem site was chosen over the originally proposed one in French Quarter thanks to the latter's reception issues. Starting on 21 March of that year, groundwork was laid for an automatic telephone system.

== Education ==
Previously residents had to complete secondary studies in Aruba or Curaçao. Prior to 1976, Sint Maarten had two secondary schools: the government secondary school John Phillips School and the Catholic secondary school Pastoor Nieuwen Huis School. Philips was both a MAVO/ETAO school while Huis was a MAVO school. The foundation Stichting Voortgezet Onderwijs van de Bovenwindse Eilanden, established on 20 February 1974, was created as the neutral governing body for a new school created by the merger of Phillips and Huis schools. MPC, the merged school, opened on 17 August 1976.

The Caribbean International Academy (CIA), founded in 2003, is a preparatory private boarding and day school on the island of St. Maarten. Catering to children from Kindergarten to Grade 12, CIA is also the only school offering Canadian/Ontario High School Diploma (OSSD) and 90% of their graduates go on to attend universities in Europe, Canada and the United States. Learning Unlimited Preparatory School (LUPS) is an American accredited institution boasting a 100% college acceptance rate, that established a Caribbean location in St.Maarten in 1991. The school is accredited by the Southern Association of Independent Schools and the Southern Association of Colleges and Schools.

Most residents who attend tertiary institutions do so in Curaçao or the European Netherlands.

The American University of the Caribbean School of Medicine (AUC), founded in 1978, was previously located on Montserrat. Because of the eruption of the Soufrière Hills volcano in 1995, AUC moved its campus to St. Maarten later that year. A permanent campus was completed in 1998 in Cupecoy.

The University of St. Martin is located in Philipsburg. The University of Sint Eustatius School of Medicine, founded in 1999, was previously located on Sint Eustatius. In September 2013, the University of Sint Eustatius moved its campus to Cole Bay, St. Maarten.

Philipsburg Jubilee Library in Philipsburg was the most prominent library in Sint Maarten. However, after Hurricane Irma hit the island in 2017, the library was forced to shut down. As of February 2019, Philipsburg Jubilee Library still lacks the funding necessary for it to be rebuilt, but has recently reopened in a temporary location until further notice.

== Transportation ==
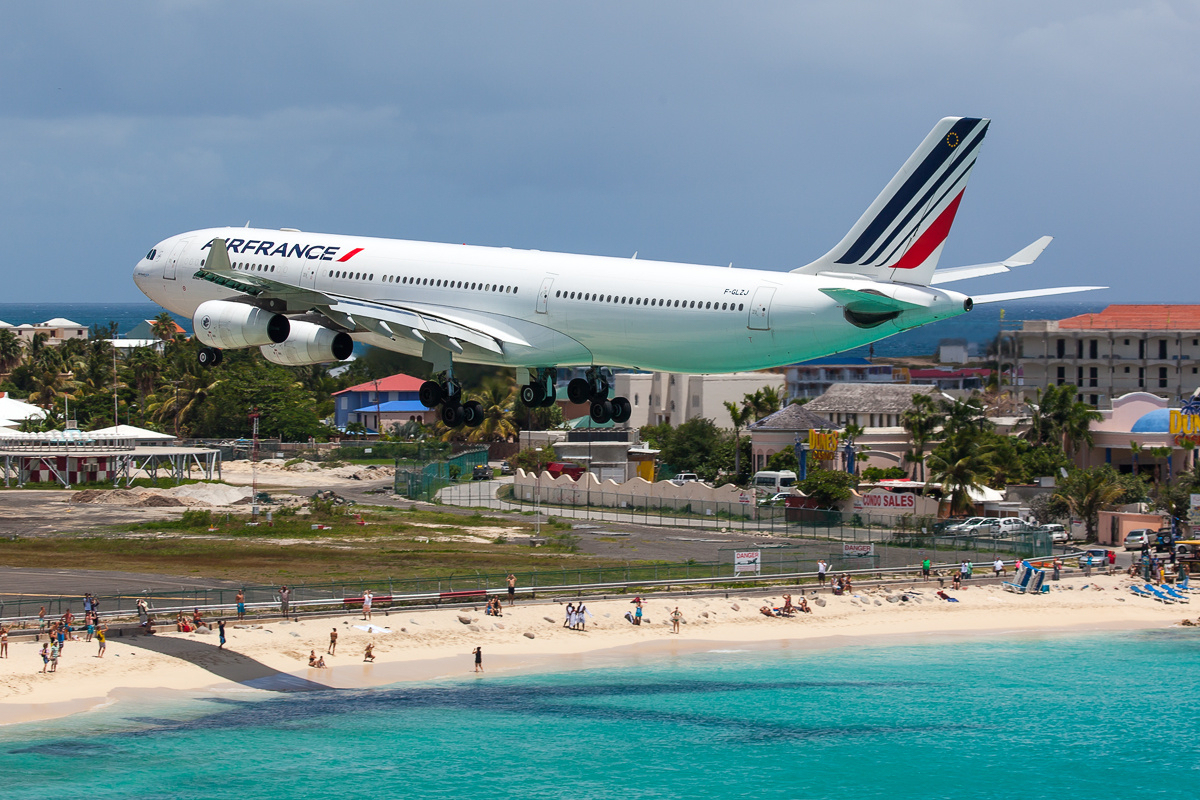
Landing at the airport

Sint Maarten is served by Princess Juliana International Airport, serving destinations across the Caribbean, North America and France and the Netherlands. It is well known for its very low final approach landings close to the popular Maho Beach at the end of the runway. Winair has its headquarters on the grounds of the airport.

== See also ==
- List of designated monuments in Sint Maarten
- List of divided islands
- Postage stamps and postal history of Sint Maarten
