= Treaty of Concordia =

1648 treaty dividing the island of Saint Martin

Partition Treaty of 1648
- Signed: 23 March 1648; 375 years ago
- Location: Mount Concordia
- Signatories: Robert de Longvilliers; Martin Thomas
- Parties: France; Dutch Republic

The Treaty of Concordia, or the Partition Treaty of 1648, was signed on 23 March 1648, between the Kingdom of France and the Dutch Republic and divided the island of Saint Martin.

== Signature ==
The treaty was signed atop Saint Martin's Mount Concordia by the two governors of the island, Robert de Longvilliers for France and Martin Thomas for the States General of the Netherlands. It divided Saint Martin between the Kingdom of France and the Dutch Republic; the peoples of St. Martin were to co-exist co-operatively.

The treaty was signed because of economical, strategical and geographical backgrounds, first and foremost a joint aversion against the Spanish that occupied the island from 1633 to 1648. The French kept the area that they occupied and the coast facing Anguilla, and the Dutch kept the area of the fort and the land around it on the south coast. The inhabitants would share the natural resources of the island.

Despite the treaty, France and the Netherlands continued to dispute the ownership of the island until 1817, when the borders on the island were finally set. Various zones that the treaty left unclear pertaining the exact location of the border, were finalized only in 2023. The lagoon in Oyster Pond was the most disputed area until that year.

== Validity ==
Questions as to its validity have arisen several times in the past and continue to cause issues. Research was supposed to be undertaken by the French Ministry of Foreign Affairs about it.

At the time of the treaty, agreements signed between representatives of the monarch had to be registered at the King's Council. That essential formality was never performed, but it seems that, on many occasions, French civil law recognised the validity of the agreement.

The treaty has always been fairly applied in practice and is referred to in the following texts:

- Franco-Dutch Convention of 28 November 1839. (See French text)
- French side gubernatorial Order of 11 February 1850 about the rules on the salt trade and use, whose Article #32 states:

The inhabitants of the French side of St. Martin will enjoy the ability to consume and export abroad salts harvested by them on the Dutch side, this under the terms of the Treaty of 1648.

- Decree of 30 July 1935, which in its Article #40 provides for the freedom of establishment in the French part of Saint-Martin for the Dutch citizens from the Dutch part of Saint-Martin:

The requirements of the Decree shall not apply to foreigners from the Dutch island of St.Martin regarding their stay and transit in the French part of the island. Foreigners from the islands of Saba, Anguilla, Statia, Saint Christopher Nevis, which at the date of this Order were finally fixed in the dependences of Saint-Martin and Saint Bartholomew for the benefit referred to in the preceding paragraph.

== Proposed abolition ==
There currently is a movement in both Sint Maarten and Saint Martin for the unification of the island, which would invalidate the Treaty of Concordia. It has been proposed that the freedom of movement allowed by this treaty may have made possible the development of a common identity by the inhabitants of both halves of the island.

== See also ==
- France–Netherlands border
- Franco-Dutch treaty on Saint Martin border controls
- History of Saint Martin
- List of treaties

== Sources ==
- Henocq, Christophe (15 March 2010), "Concordia Treaty, 23rd March 1648", Heritage, 6
