= Stichting Voortgezet Onderwijs van de Bovenwindse Eilanden =

Operator of schools on Sint Maarten

Stichting Voortgezet Onderwijs van de Bovenwindse Eilanden (SVOBE; "Foundation for the Advancement of Secondary Education Windward Islands") is a nonprofit organisation that operates two secondary schools on Sint Maarten: Milton Peters College (MPC) in South Reward and Sundial School in Philipsburg. They are both subsidised by the Sint Maarten government.

Milton Peters has HAVO (Senior General Secondary Education), VWO (pre-university), and VSBO (preparatory secondary vocational education) classes; the third includes PKL (practically oriented framework), PBL (practically oriented basic training), TKL classes (theoretical framework). The HAVO, VWO, and VSBO-TKL classes are all Dutch medium while other departments have English and Dutch medium classes. As of 2017 MPC is the largest secondary school in Sint Maarten. MPC is the only Sint Maarten secondary school with a Dutch pre-university programme.

== History ==
SVOBE was established on 20 February 1974. SVOBE was created as the neutral governing body for a new school created by the merger of the government secondary school John Phillips School and the Catholic secondary school Pastoor Nieuwen Huis School. MPC, which began construction in 1974, opened on 17 August 1976.

The predecessor of Sundial, School for Home Economics, opened in 1966. It became a part of SVOBE in 1976.
