= Unification of Saint Martin =

Unification of the Caribbean island of Saint Martin

The "Unity Flag" of Saint Martin, used in both halves of the island

Map of the island of Saint Martin. In orange is the Dutch part of the island (Sint Maarten) and in green is the French one (the Collectivity of Saint Martin).

The unification of Saint Martin (Dutch: Eenwording van Sint Maarten; French: Unification de Saint-Martin) is the proposed unification of the small island of Saint Martin, located in the Caribbean Sea. Currently, it is divided into Sint Maarten (the southern portion of the island, one of the constituent countries within the Kingdom of the Netherlands) and the Collectivity of Saint Martin (the northern portion of the island, an integral part of France). The island has been divided since the signing of the Treaty of Concordia in 1648, which today remains as one of the oldest treaties still in effect.

The Treaty of Concordia allows freedom of movement between both parts of the island, which has promoted a common sentiment among the island's inhabitants, although this is also the reason why some see a formal unification as unnecessary. Other arguments against unification of the island are that neither France nor the Netherlands would allow it and that both sides would require full independence to achieve it.

== Unity Flag ==
On 31 August 1990, the "Unity Flag" of Saint Martin was adopted at the Preliminary Conference on National Symbols at the Philipsburg Jubilee Library, in Sint Maarten. This flag was created to represent the people of both halves of the island and the unification of the latter, and could be seen before officialization hoisted on some houses and sometimes by churches and religious groups in the island of Saint Martin. In August 2020, when restrictions and controls were added to the Saint Martin–Sint Maarten border to contain the COVID-19 pandemic, some protesters against these measures flew this flag with them. In September 2020, these restrictions were lifted, and people from both sides of the island started chanting "One island, one people, one destiny".

The Unity Flag was officially adopted by the authorities of both halves of the island in a ceremony held in Philipsburg, the capital of Sint Maarten, on 8 November 2022, in presence of the Prime Minister of Sint Maarten, Silveria Jacobs, and the President of the Territorial Council of Saint Martin, Louis Mussington. The flag is now raised every 11 November, on St. Martin's Day, on both halves of Saint Martin.

== Notable supporters ==
Notable supporters of the movement for uniting the island include Albert Fleming, former leader of the Collectivity of Saint Martin, who in 2014 stated his support for the unification of the island.

== See also ==
- Samoan unification
