= Simpson Bay Lagoon =

Lagoon on the island Saint Martin in the Caribbean

- Simson Bay Lagoon; The Great Pond
- Simpsonbaailagune (Dutch); Grand Étang de Simpsonbaai (French)
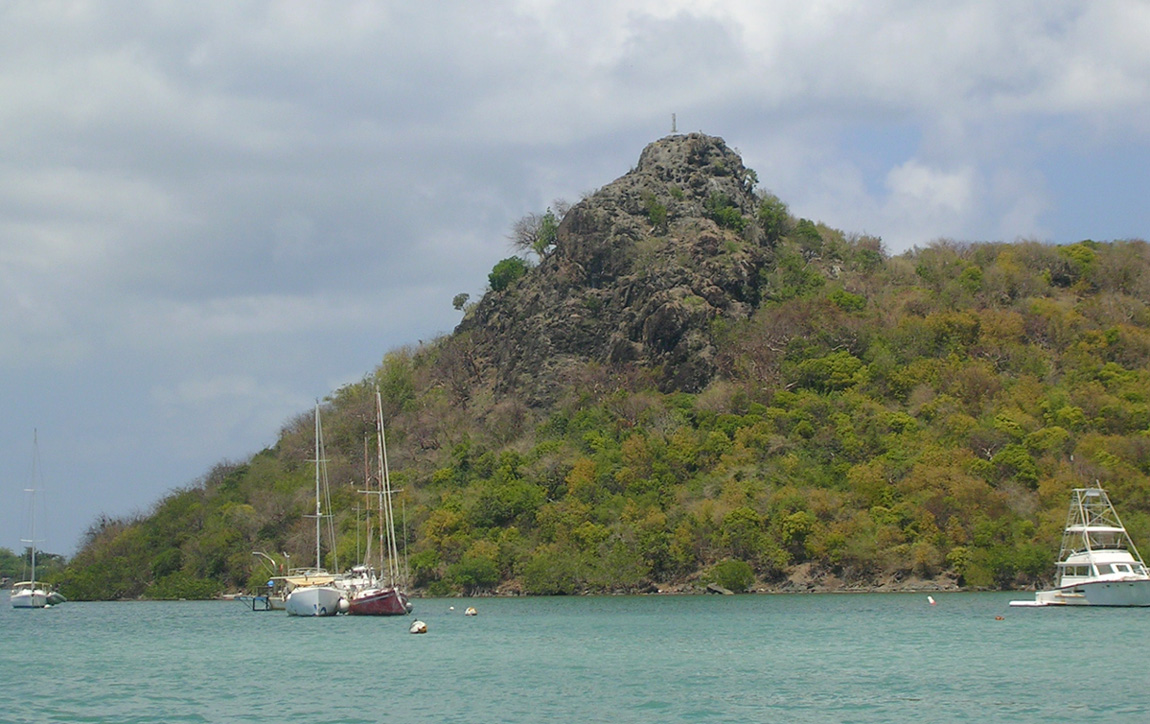

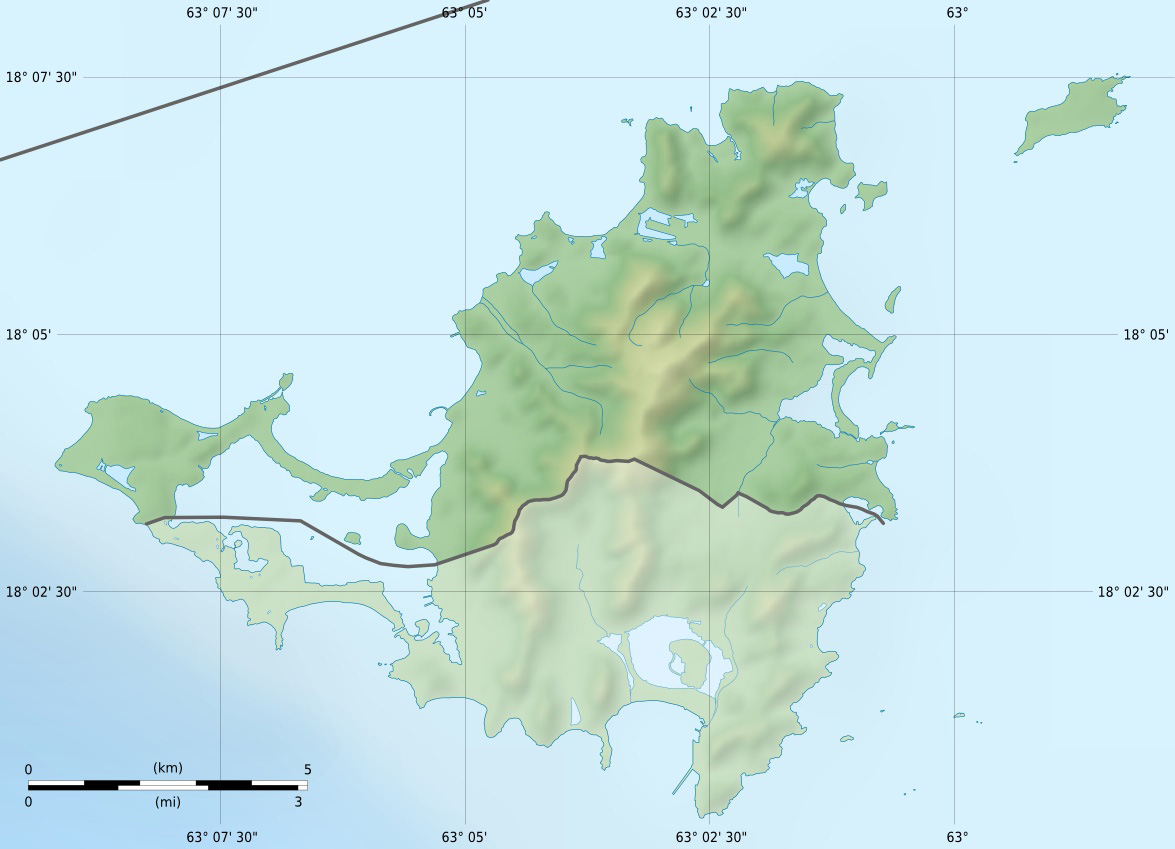
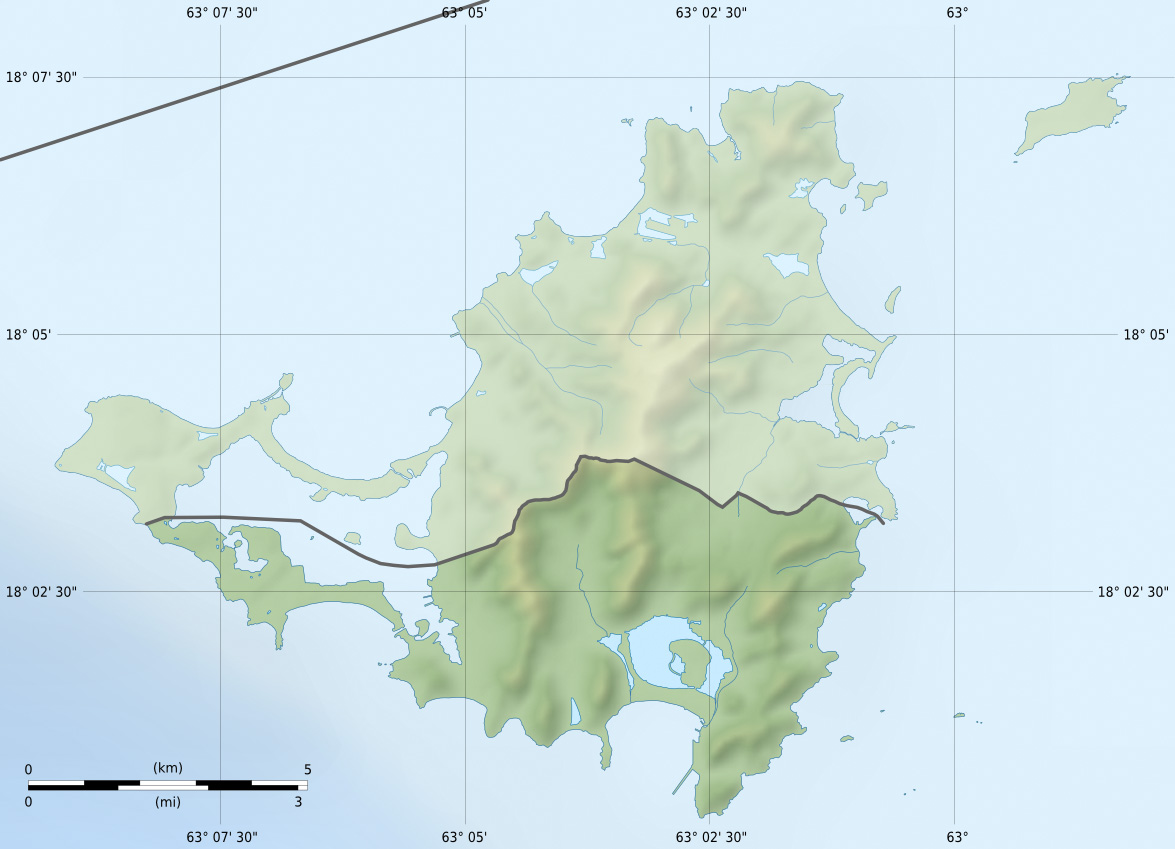
- Location in the island of Saint Martin Simpson Bay Lagoon (Sint Maarten)
- Coordinates: 18.052°N 63.109°W
- Primary outflows: Baie Nettlé; Simson Bay
- Ocean/sea sources: Caribbean sea
- Basin countries: Saint Martin; Sint Maarten
- Designation

Ramsar Wetland
- Official name: Mullet Pond
- Designated: 23 May 2014
- Reference no.: 2270
- Surface area: 1,250 hectares (3,100 acres)
- Max. depth: 6 metres (20 ft)
- Shore length^{1}: 4.48 kilometres (2.78 mi)
- Islands: Grand îlet Little Key
- ^{1} Shore length is not a well-defined measure.

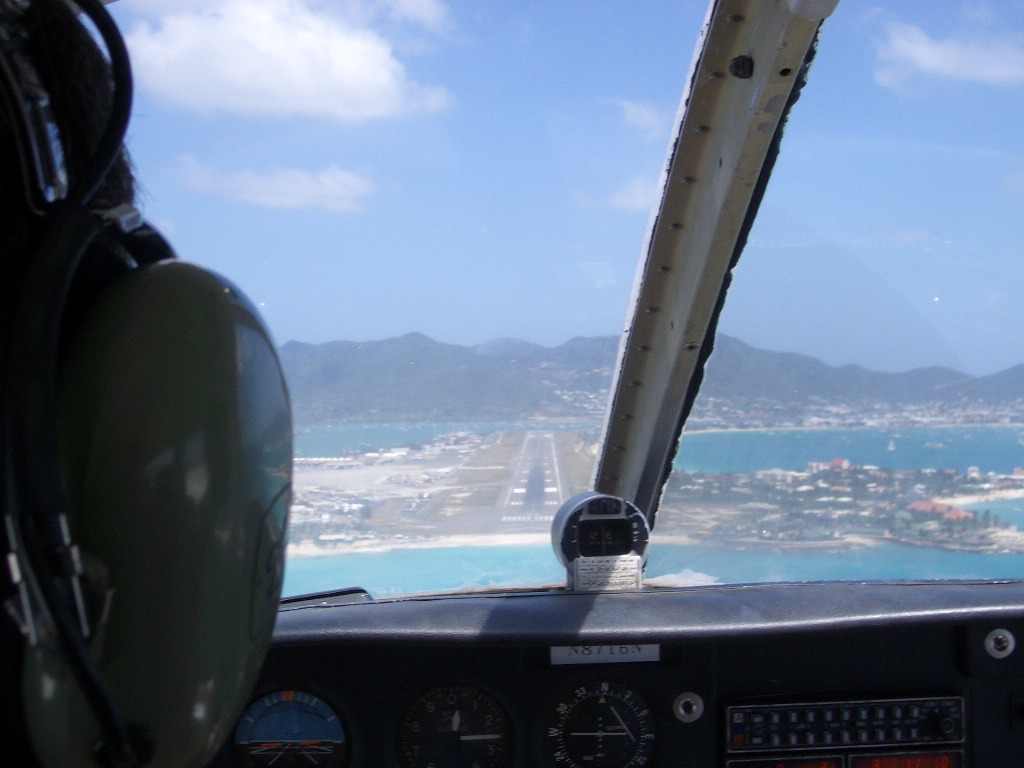
Approaching Princess Juliana International Airport at Maho Beach. Simpson Bay Lagoon is to the left.

Simpson Bay Lagoon (also spelt Simson Bay Lagoon, or referred to simply as the Great Pond) is one of the largest inland lagoons in the West Indies of the Caribbean. It is located on the island of Saint Martin. The border between the French and Dutch halves of the island runs across the centre of the lagoon. There are two small islands that lie in the lagoon: the larger, Grand Ilet (also known as Explorer's Island) to the north, is within the French region of Saint-Martin; the smaller, Little Key, to the south, is on the Dutch Sint Maarten side. Historically it was not a lagoon, but a lake. A hurricane in 1819 breached the natural isthmus at Pelican, isolating the Simpson Bay fishing community for a century. Halfway through the 20th century, an artificial canal at the current Simpson Bay Lagoon Bridge replaced the initial natural waterway.

The lagoon is connected to the Caribbean Sea via a small channel in the north-west which flows into Baie Nettlé in Saint-Martin and another small channel in the south-east which flows into Simpson Bay in Sint Maarten. Sint Maarten's airport, Princess Juliana International Airport lies close to the lagoon's southern shore.

Previously, traffic between Marigot and Princess Juliana International Airport (SXM) had to go around the lagoon via the Lowlands area. In 2013, the Simpson Bay Causeway Bridge was opened. This bridge connects the Marigot area with the northern end of the airport runway, considerably reducing distance and time to reach the airport.

== Environment ==
The protected waters of this lagoon provide significant seagrass and mangrove habitats, well known juvenile reef fish recruitment areas which likely feed the marine protected areas of Man of War Shoal Marine Park of St. Maarten and the Reserve Naturelle de Saint-Martin.

Mullet Pond is a section of the Simpson Bay Lagoon which still contains a substantial portion of Red Mangroves Rhizophora mangle. It has been a protected Ramsar site since 2014.

Studies have shown that land-based sewage wastewater entering the Lagoon has resulted in bacterial levels far exceeding acceptable norms. Research by Environmental Protection in the Caribbean (EPIC) on lagoon and watershed water quality has shown that enterococci bacterial levels exceeded allowable levels in 96% (n=26) of samples. Land-based sites were found to be more polluted than the Lagoon, indicating that a significant portion of contamination originates from the land and not just from boats.

With only two narrow channels which permit the flow of fresh water into this large body of water, certain urbanized areas of the lagoon, such as Cole Bay and Marigot, do not experience sufficient water flow to remove or dilute pollutants. High pollution areas therefore frequently exhibit murky or brown water with a foul odor and excessive algal growth and eutrophication.

The presence of invasive species, such as the seagrass H. stipulacea, poses additional threats to the lagoon environment.

== Economy ==
St. Maarten's marine industry, centered around the Lagoon, represents 12.5% of the island economy, compared to 9.5% for the Hotel and Restaurant industry (Central Bureau of Statistics). The calm waters of the lagoon make it a safe harbor for vessels seeking repairs, supplies, and protection from hurricanes. The megayacht charter industry is a conspicuous aspect of the yachting sector.

Major economic events are the yachting high season (winter), the Caribbean Multihull Challenge (regatta) in the first days of February and the St. Maarten Heineken Regatta in early March.

== See also ==
- List of Designated Monuments in Simpson Bay
