= Outline of the Collectivity of Saint Martin =

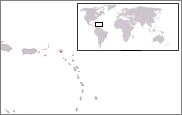
The location of Saint Martin

An enlargeable map of the French Overseas Collectivity of Saint Martin

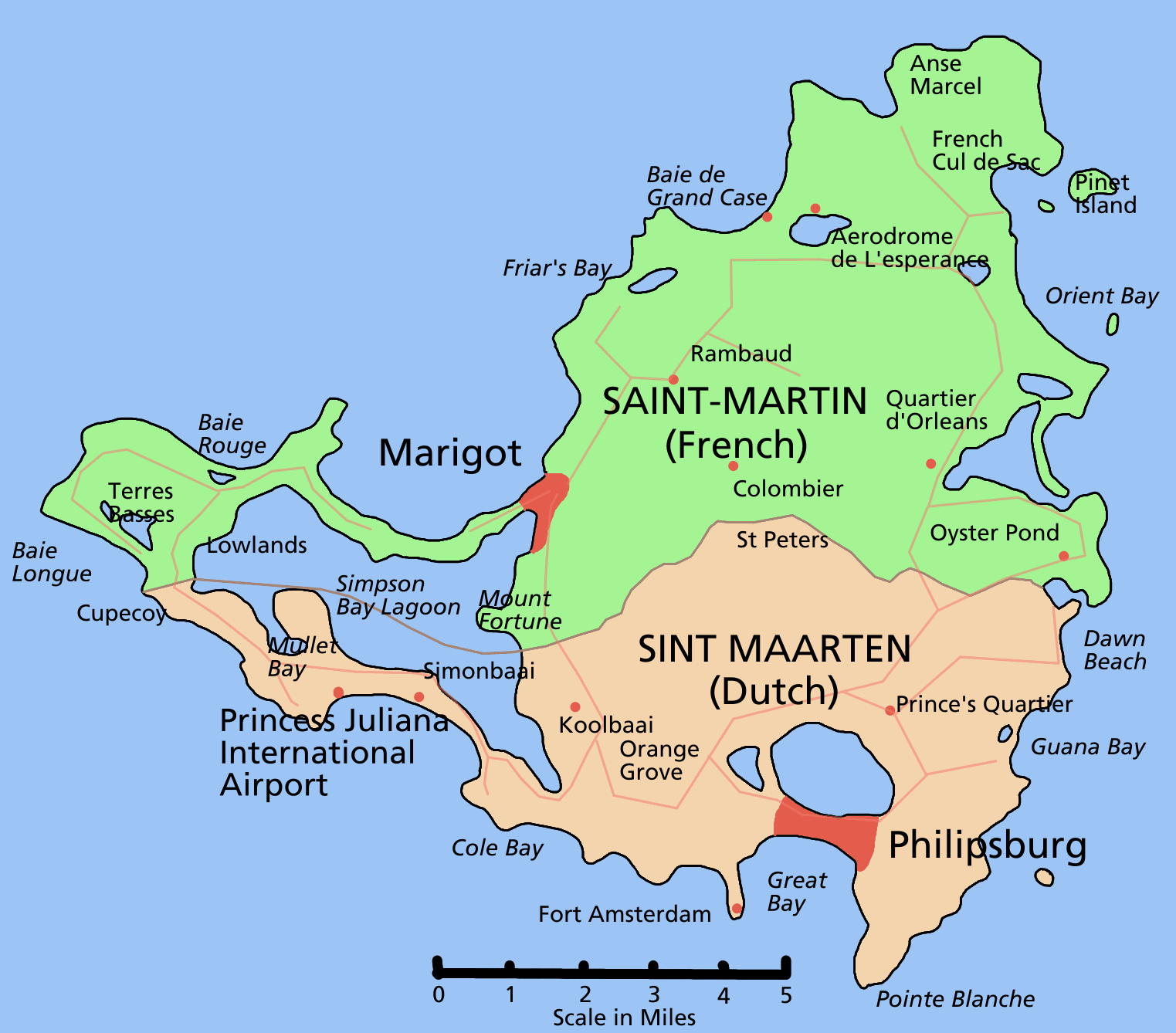
A map of the island of Saint Martin

The following outline is provided as an overview of and topical guide to the Collectivity of Saint Martin:

The Collectivity of Saint Martin (French: Collectivité de Saint-Martin) is an overseas collectivity of France located in the Leeward Islands of the Lesser Antilles archipelago in the Caribbean Sea. It came into being on February 22, 2007, encompassing the northern parts of the island of Saint Martin and neighbouring islets, the largest of which is Île Tintamarre. The southern part of the island, Sint Maarten, is a constituent country of the Kingdom of the Netherlands.

== General reference ==
- Pronunciation:
- Common English country name: Saint Martin
- Official English country name: The French Overseas Collectivity of Saint Martin
- Common endonym: Saint-Martin
- Official endonym: Collectivité de Saint-Martin
- Adjectival(s): Saint-Martinoise
- Demonym(s): Saint-Martinoise
- ISO country codes: MF, MAF, 663
- ISO region codes: See ISO 3166-2:MF
- Internet country code top-level domain: .mf

== Geography of Saint Martin ==
An enlargeable topographic map of the island of Saint Martin

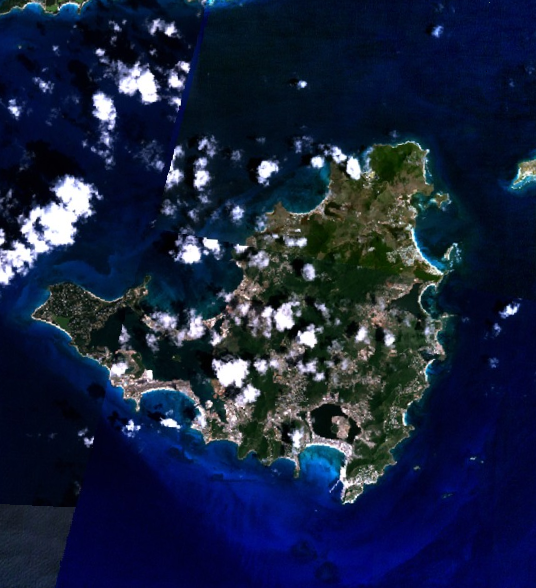
An enlargeable satellite image of the island of Saint Martin

- Saint Martin is: an island, and an overseas collectivity of France
- Location:
  - Northern Hemisphere and Western Hemisphere
    - North America (though not on the mainland)
  - Atlantic Ocean
    - North Atlantic
      - Caribbean
        - Antilles
          - Lesser Antilles
            - Leeward Islands
              - French West Indies
                - Saint Martin Island (which it shares with the Netherlands Antilles)
  - Time zone: Eastern Caribbean Time (UTC-04)
  - Extreme points of Saint Martin
    - High: Pic Paradis 424 m (1,391 ft)
    - Low: Caribbean Sea 0 m
  - Land boundaries: Netherlands Antilles 15 km
  - Coastline: Caribbean Sea
- Population of Saint Martin:
- Area of Saint Martin:
- Atlas of Saint Martin

=== Natural geographical features of Saint Martin ===
- Anguilla Channel
- Islands of Saint Martin (France):
  - Northern portion of the island of Saint Martin
  - Caye Verte
  - Crowl Rock
  - Grand Îlet
  - Île Tintamarre
  - Petite Clef
  - Pinel
  - Rocher de l’Anse Marcel
- Rivers of Saint Martin
- Simpson Bay Lagoon

== Government and politics of Saint Martin ==
Politics of the Collectivity of Saint Martin

- Form of government:
- Head of state: President of France
- Head of government: President of the Territorial Council, Louis Mussington
- Cabinet of Saint Martin: The Territorial Council of the Collectivity of Saint Martin
- Capital of Saint Martin: Marigot
- Political parties in the Collectivity of Saint Martin
- Elections:
  - 2007 Saint Martin Territorial Council election

=== International organization membership ===
The Collectivity of Saint Martin is a member of:

- Universal Postal Union (UPU)
- World Federation of Trade Unions (WFTU)

== History of Saint Martin ==
History of Saint Martin

- French colonization of the Americas
- Arrondissement of Saint-Martin-Saint-Barthélemy
- Treaty of Concordia

== Culture of Saint Martin ==
Culture of Saint Martin

- French America
- Language in Saint Martin
  - French
  - Virgin Islands Creole
- National symbols of Saint Martin
  - Coat of arms of the Collectivity of Saint Martin
  - Flag of Saint Martin
  - National anthem of Saint Martin
- Scouting and Guiding in Guadeloupe and Saint Martin
- Sport in Saint Martin
  - Football in Saint Martin
    - Comité de Football des Îles du Nord
    - Saint-Martin Championships
    - Saint Martin national football team
  - Rugby union in Saint Martin
- World Heritage Sites in Saint Martin: None

== Economy and infrastructure of Saint Martin ==
- Currency of Saint Martin: Euro (see also: Euro topics)
  - ISO 4217: EUR

== Infrastructure of Saint Martin ==
- Communications in Saint Martin
  - .gp
  - .mf
- Transportation in Saint Martin
  - Airports in Saint Martin
    - L'Espérance Airport

== See also ==
- Saint Martin
- List of international rankings
- Outline of France
- Outline of geography
- Outline of North America
- Outline of South America
