= Index of the Collectivity of Saint Martin–related articles =

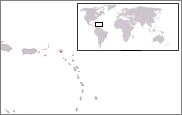
The location of the French overseas collectivity of Saint Martin

The following is an alphabetical list of topics related to the French overseas collectivity of Saint Martin.

== 0–9 ==
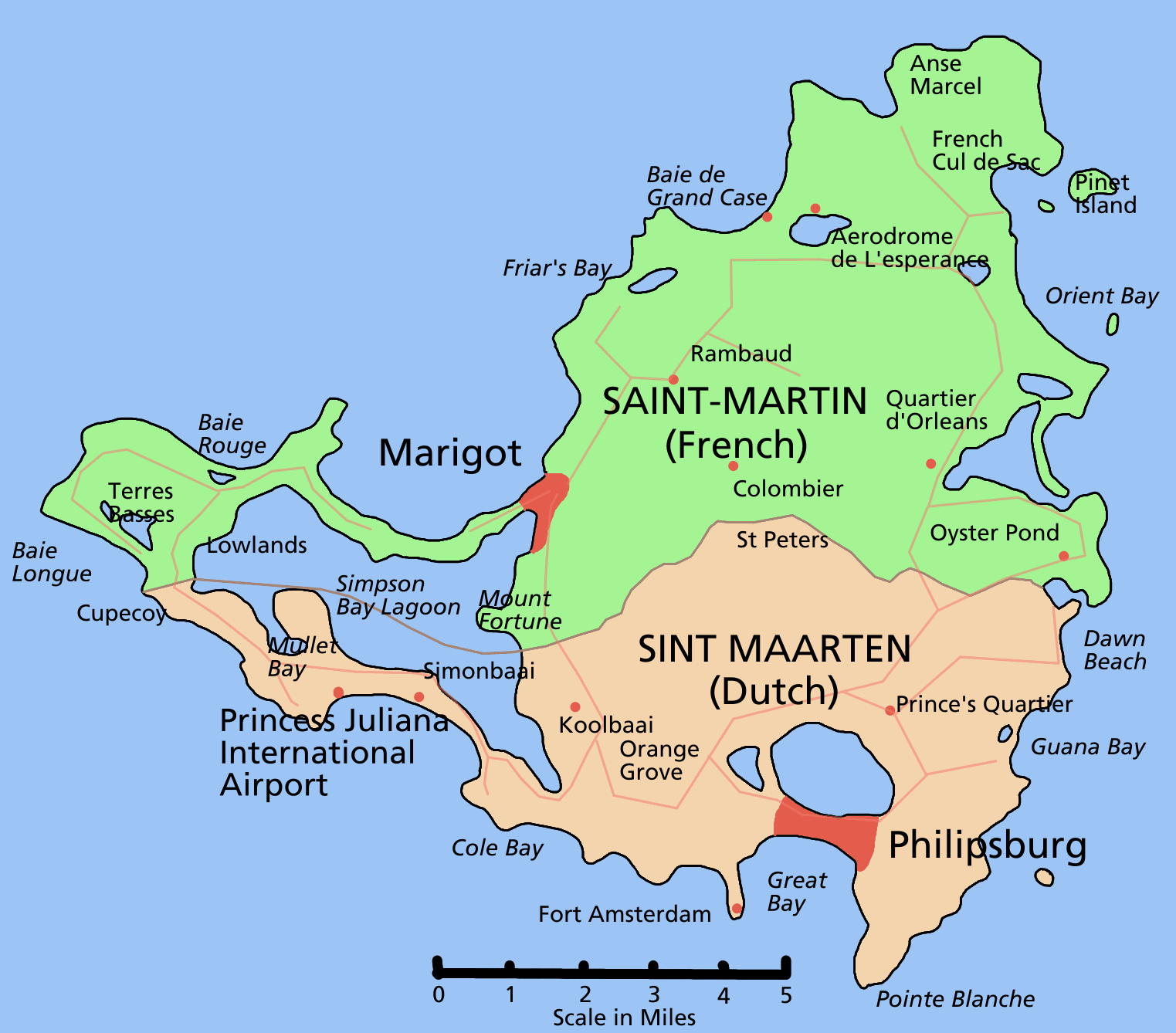
A map of Saint-Martin (Sint Maarten)

- .mf – Internet country code top-level domain for the French overseas collectivity of Saint-Martin

== A ==
- Adjacent country:

Netherlands Antilles - Sint Maarten

- Airports on Saint Martin
- Americas
  - North America
    - North Atlantic Ocean
      - West Indies
        - Mer des Caraïbes (Caribbean Sea)
          - Antilles
            - Petites Antilles (Lesser Antilles)
              - Islands of Saint Martin (France)
                - Saint-Martin
- Antilles
- Arrondissement of Saint-Martin-Saint-Barthélemy
- Atlas of Saint-Martin

== C ==
- Capital of Saint-Martin: Marigot
- Caribbean
- Caribbean Sea
- Categories:
  - Category:Saint Martin (island)
    - Category:Communications in Saint Martin (island)
    - Category:Collectivity of Saint Martin culture
    - Category:Geography of the Collectivity of Saint Martin
    - Category:History of the Collectivity of Saint Martin
    - Category:Maps of Saint Martin
    - Category:Natural history of Saint Martin (island)
    - Category:Collectivity of Saint Martin
      - Category:Communications in the Collectivity of Saint Martin
      - Category:Collectivity of Saint Martin culture
      - Category:Geography of the Collectivity of Saint Martin
      - Category:History of the Collectivity of Saint Martin
      - Category:Politics of the Collectivity of Saint Martin
      - Category:Collectivity of Saint Martin-related lists
      - Category: Populated places in the Collectivity of Saint Martin
      - Category:Sport in the Collectivity of Saint Martin
      - Category:Transport in the Collectivity of Saint Martin
    - commons:Category:Saint Martin (France)
    - Category:Saint Martin society
    - Category:Sint Maarten
  - commons:Category:Saint Martin (island)
- Coat of arms of Saint Martin (France)
- Collectivité de Saint-Martin (French overseas collectivity of Saint Martin)
- Comité de Football des Îles du Nord
- Communications in Saint Martin (France)
- Culture of Saint Martin

== E ==
- Eilandgebied Sint Maarten

== F ==
The Flag of France

- Flag of France
- Flag of Saint Martin (France)
- France
- French America
- French colonization of the Americas
- French language
- French overseas collectivity of Saint Martin (Collectivité de Saint-Martin)
- French Republic (République française)

== H ==
- History of Saint Martin
- Hurricane Lenny
- Hurricane Luis

== I ==
- Île de Saint-Martin
- Île Tintamarre
- International Organization for Standardization (ISO)
  - ISO 3166-1 alpha-2 country code for Saint Martin (France): MF
  - ISO 3166-1 alpha-3 country code for Saint Martin (France): MAF
- Islands of Saint Martin (France):
  - Northern portion of the island of Saint Martin
  - Caye Verte
  - Crowl Rock
  - Grand Îlet
  - Île Tintamarre
  - Petite Clef
  - Pinel (Saint-Martin)
  - Rocher de l’Anse Marcel

== L ==
- L'Espérance Airport
- Lists related to Saint-Martin:
  - List of airports in Saint Martin
  - List of islands of Saint Martin (France)
  - List of political parties in Saint Martin (France)
  - List of rivers of Saint Martin (France)
  - Outline of Saint Martin

== M ==
- Marigot – Capital of Saint-Martin

== N ==
- Nance
- Netherlands Antilles

== O ==
- O sweet Saint-Martin's Land (bi-national song/anthem of Saint-Martin/Sint-Maarten)

== P ==
- Political parties in Saint Martin (France)
- Politics of Saint Martin (France)

== R ==
- République française (French Republic)
- Rivers of Saint Martin (France)

== S ==
- Saint Martin island
- Saint Martin Creole language
- 2007 Saint Martin Territorial Council election
- Saint Martin national football team
- Saint-Martinois, citizen of Saint-Martin
- Scouting in Saint Martin (France)
- Simpson Bay Lagoon
- Sint Maarten

== T ==
- Treaty of Concordia, 1648
- Topic outline of Saint Martin (France)

== W ==
- Wikimedia Atlas of Saint-Martin

== See also ==
- List of Caribbean-related topics
- List of international rankings
- Lists of country-related topics
- Topic outline of geography
- Topic outline of North America

== Related articles ==
- Baldachino, Godfrey (2006), "The Impact of Public Policy on Entrepreneurship: A Critical Investigation of the Protestant Ethic on a Divided Island Jurisdiction," Journal of Small Business and Entrepreneurship 19 (4), pp. 419–430.
- Dana, Leo Paul (1990), “Saint Martin/Sint Maarten: A Case Study of the Effects of Politics and Culture on Economic Development,” Journal of Small Business Management XXVIII (4) October, pp. 91–98.
- Dana, Leo Paul (2010), Entrepreneurship & Religion, Cheltenham, United Kingdom: Edward Elgar, ISBN 978-1-84720-572-8.
- Houston, Lynn Marie (2005). Food Culture in the Caribbean. Greenwood Press, 2005. ISBN 0-313-32764-5.
