= Fort Louis =

Fort Louis may refer to several historic French settlements including:

- Fort Louis (La Rochelle), built by Louis XIII in 1620.
- Fort Louis (Pondicherry), French fort in Pondicherry, destroyed in 1761.
- Fort Louis, Senegal, a major French trading post on the Senegal River in West Africa.
- Fort Louis de La Louisiane, the name of Mobile, Alabama before 1712.
- Fort Louisbourg, the historic site of Louisbourg, Nova Scotia.
- Fort Louis (fortress), the Rhine fortress around which developed the commune of Fort-Louis, Bas-Rhin
- Fort-Louis, a commune in the Bas-Rhin department, France
- Fort Louis military camp, Kansas (during World War I)
- Fort Louis (Saint Martin), a French fort located in Marigot, Saint Martin.
