= Lists of country-related topics =

Each entry below presents a list of topics about a specific nation or state (country), followed by a link to the main article for that country. Entries for nations are in bold type, while those for subnational entities are in normal (unbolded) type.

== A ==
- **Index of Abkhazia-related articles** - Abkhazia
- (United Kingdom) Index of Akrotiri and Dhekelia-related articles - Sovereign Base Area of Akrotiri (UK overseas territory)
- Index of Åland-related articles - Åland (Autonomous province of Finland)
- **Outline of Algeria** - People's Democratic Republic of Algeria
- Index of American Samoa-related articles - Territory of American Samoa (US overseas territory)
- **Outline of Andorra** - Principality of Andorra
- **Outline of Angola** - Republic of Angola
- Index of Anguilla-related articles - Anguilla (UK overseas territory)
- **Index of Antigua and Barbuda-related articles** - Antigua and Barbuda
- **Outline of Argentina** - Argentine Republic
- **Outline of Armenia** - Republic of Armenia
- **Index of Artsakh-related articles** - Republic of Artsakh
- Index of Aruba-related articles - Aruba (Self-governing country in the Kingdom of the Netherlands)
- Index of Ascension Island–related articles - Ascension Island (Dependency of the UK overseas territory of Saint Helena)
- **Outline of Australia** - Commonwealth of Australia
- **Index of Austria-related articles** - Republic of Austria
- **Outline of Azerbaijan** - Republic of Azerbaijan

== B ==
- **Index of the Bahamas–related articles** - Commonwealth of The Bahamas
- **Outline of Bahrain** - Kingdom of Bahrain
- **List of Bangladesh-related topics** - People's Republic of Bangladesh
- **Index of Barbados-related articles** - Barbados
- **List of Belarus-related topics** - Republic of Belarus
- **Outline of Belgium** - Kingdom of Belgium
- **List of Belize-related topics** - Belize
- **Outline of Benin** - Republic of Benin
- List of Bermuda-related topics - Bermuda (UK overseas territory)
- **List of Bolivia-related topics** - Republic of Bolivia
- **Outline of Bosnia and Herzegovina** - Bosnia and Herzegovina
- **List of Botswana-related topics** - Republic of Botswana
- List of British Virgin Islands-related topics - British Virgin Islands (UK overseas territory)
- **List of Brunei-related topics** - Negara Brunei Darussalam
- **Outline of Bulgaria** - Republic of Bulgaria
- **Outline of Burkina Faso** - Burkina Faso
- **Outline of Burundi** - Republic of Burundi

== C ==
- **Outline of Cambodia** - Kingdom of Cambodia
- **Outline of Cameroon** - Republic of Cameroon
- **Outline of Canada** - Canada
- Index of Cayman Islands-related articles - Cayman Islands (UK overseas territory)
- **List of Central African Republic-related topics** - Central African Republic
- **Outline of Chad** - Republic of Chad
- **List of Chile-related topics** - Republic of Chile
- **Outline of China** - People's Republic of China
- Index of Christmas Island–related articles - Territory of Christmas Island (Australian overseas territory)
- Index of Cocos (Keeling) Islands-related articles - Territory of Cocos (Keeling) Islands (Australian overseas territory)
- **Outline of Colombia** - Republic of Colombia
- **Outline of the Democratic Republic of the Congo** - Democratic Republic of the Congo
- Index of Cook Islands–related articles - Cook Islands (Self-governing in free association with New Zealand)
- **Outline of Costa Rica** - Republic of Costa Rica
- **Outline of Croatia** - Republic of Croatia
- **Outline of Cuba** - Republic of Cuba
- **Index of Curaçao-related articles** - Curaçao
- **Outline of Cyprus** - Republic of Cyprus
- **List of Czech Republic-related topics** - Czech Republic

== D ==
- **Index of Denmark-related articles** - Kingdom of Denmark
- (United Kingdom) Index of Akrotiri and Dhekelia-related articles - Sovereign Base Areas of Dhekelia (UK overseas territory)
- **Outline of Dominica** - Commonwealth of Dominica

== E ==
- **List of East Timor-related topics** - Democratic Republic of Timor-Leste
- **Outline of Egypt** - Arab Republic of Egypt
- **Outline of England** - England
- **Outline of Estonia** - Republic of Estonia
- **Outline of Ethiopia** - Federal Democratic Republic of Ethiopia

== F ==
- List of Falkland Islands-related topics - Falkland Islands (UK overseas territory)
- Outline of the Faroe Islands - Faroe Islands (Self-governing country in the Kingdom of Denmark)
- **Index of Fiji-related articles** - Republic of the Fiji Islands
- **List of Finland-related topics** - Republic of Finland
- **Outline of France** - French Republic
- (France) Index of French Guiana-related articles - French Guiana (French overseas department)
- Index of French Polynesia-related articles - French Polynesia (French overseas community)

== G ==
- **Outline of Gabon** - Gabonese Republic
- (Georgia (country)) **Outline of Georgia (country)** - Georgia
- **Index of Germany-related articles** - Federal Republic of Germany
- **Outline of Ghana** - Republic of Ghana
- **Outline of Gibraltar** - Gibraltar
- **Outline of Greece** - Hellenic Republic
- Index of Greenland-related articles - Greenland (Self-governing country in the Kingdom of Denmark)
- **Index of Grenada-related articles** - Grenada
- (France) Index of Guadeloupe-related articles - Guadeloupe (French overseas department)
- Index of Guam-related articles - Territory of Guam (US overseas territory)
- **Outline of Guatemala** - Republic of Guatemala
- Index of Guernsey-related articles - Bailiwick of Guernsey (British Crown dependency)
- (France) Index of French Guiana-related articles - French Guiana (French overseas department)
- **Outline of Guinea-Bissau** - Republic of Guinea-Bissau
- **Outline of Guyana** - Co-operative Republic of Guyana

== H ==
- **Outline of Haiti** - Republic of Haiti
- **List of Honduras-related topics** - Republic of Honduras
- Index of Hong Kong-related articles - Hong Kong (a highly autonomous territory)

== I ==
- **Index of Iceland-related articles** - Republic of Iceland
- **List of Indonesia-related topics** - Republic of Indonesia
- **List of Iran-related topics** - Islamic Republic of Iran
- (Republic of Ireland) **List of Ireland-related topics** - Ireland
  - See Index of Falkland Islands-related articles for Islas Malvinas
- Outline of the Isle of Man - Isle of Man (British Crown dependency)
- **Outline of Israel** - State of Israel
- **Index of Italy-related articles** - Italian Republic

== J ==
- **Outline of Jamaica** - Jamaica
- **Index of Japan-related articles** - Japan
- Outline of Jersey - Bailiwick of Jersey (British Crown dependency)
- **Outline of Jordan** - Hashemite Kingdom of Jordan

== K ==
- **Outline of Kazakhstan** - Republic of Kazakhstan
- **Outline of Kenya** - Republic of Kenya
- **Outline of Kiribati** - Republic of Kiribati
- **Outline of North Korea** - Democratic People's Republic of Korea
- **Outline of South Korea** - Republic of Korea
- **Outline of Kosovo** - Republic of Kosovo
- **Index of Kuwait-related articles** - State of Kuwait
- **Outline of Kyrgyzstan** - Kyrgyz Republic

== L ==
- **List of Laos-related topics** - Lao People's Democratic Republic
- **Outline of Latvia** - Republic of Latvia
- **Outline of Lebanon** - Lebanese Republic
- **Outline of Libya** - Great Socialist People's Libyan Arab Jamahiriya
- **Outline of Liechtenstein** - Principality of Liechtenstein
- **Outline of Lithuania** - Republic of Lithuania
- **Outline of Luxembourg** - Grand Duchy of Luxembourg

== M ==
- Index of Macau-related articles - Macao (Area of special sovereignty)
- **Outline of Madagascar** - Republic of Madagascar
- **List of Malaysia-related topics** - Malaysia
- **List of Maldives-related topics** - Republic of Maldives
- **Outline of Mali** - Republic of Mali
- **Index of Malta-related articles** - Republic of Malta
- **Index of Marshall Islands-related articles** - Republic of the Marshall Islands
- (France) Index of Martinique-related articles - Martinique (French overseas department)
- **List of Mauritius-related topics** - Republic of Mauritius
- List of Mayotte-related topics - Mayotte (French overseas community)
- **Outline of Mexico** - United Mexican States
- **Outline of Moldova** - Republic of Moldova
- **Outline of Monaco** - Principality of Monaco
- **Outline of Mongolia** - Mongolia
- **Outline of Montenegro** - Republic of Montenegro
- Index of Montserrat-related articles - Montserrat (UK overseas territory)
- **Outline of Morocco** - Kingdom of Morocco
- **Outline of Mozambique** - Republic of Mozambique

== N ==
- **Index of Artsakh-related articles** - Republic of Artsakh
- **Outline of Namibia** - Republic of Namibia
- **Index of Nauru-related articles** - Republic of Nauru
- **Outline of Nepal** - Kingdom of Nepal
- **Outline of the Netherlands** - Kingdom of the Netherlands
- Index of Netherlands Antilles-related articles - Netherlands Antilles (Self-governing country in the Kingdom of the Netherlands)
- Outline of New Caledonia - Territory of New Caledonia and Dependencies (French community sui generis)
- **Outline of New Zealand** - New Zealand
- **Outline of Nicaragua** - Republic of Nicaragua
- **Outline of Niger** - Republic of Niger
- **Outline of Nigeria** - Federal Republic of Nigeria
- Outline of Niue - Niue (Self-governing in free association with New Zealand)
- **Outline of North Korea** - Democratic People's Republic of Korea
- **Outline of North Macedonia** - Republic of North Macedonia
- Outline of Norfolk Island - Territory of Norfolk Island (Australian overseas territory)
- **Outline of Northern Cyprus** - Turkish Republic of Northern Cyprus
- (United Kingdom) **List of Northern Ireland-related topics** - Northern Ireland
- Index of Northern Mariana Islands-related articles - Commonwealth of the Northern Mariana Islands (US overseas commonwealth)
- **Outline of Norway** - Kingdom of Norway

== O ==
- **Outline of Oman** - Sultanate of Oman

== P ==
- **Index of Palau-related articles** - Republic of Palau
- **Outline of Panama** - Republic of Panama
- **Outline of Papua New Guinea** - Independent State of Papua New Guinea
- **Outline of Paraguay** - Republic of Paraguay
- **Outline of Peru** - Republic of Peru
- **List of Philippines-related topics** - Republic of the Philippines
- Outline of the Pitcairn Islands - Pitcairn, Henderson, Ducie, and Oeno Islands (UK overseas territory)
- **Outline of Poland** - Republic of Poland
- **Outline of Portugal** - Portuguese Republic
- **Outline of Transnistria** - Pridnestrovian Moldavian Republic
- **Outline of Puerto Rico** - Commonwealth of Puerto Rico (US overseas commonwealth)
- Outline of Puntland - Self-autonomous state in East Africa

== Q ==
- **List of Qatar-related topics** - State of Qatar

== R ==
- **Outline of Romania** - Romania
- **Outline of Russia** - Russian Federation
- **Outline of Rwanda** - Republic of Rwanda

== S ==
- (Western Sahara) **Outline of the Sahrawi Arab Democratic Republic** - Sahrawi Arab Democratic Republic
- (France) Index of Saint Barthélemy-related articles - Saint Barthélemy (French overseas collectivity)
- Outline of Saint Helena - Saint Helena (UK overseas territory)
- **Index of Saint Kitts and Nevis-related articles** - Federation of Saint Christopher and Nevis
- **Index of Saint Lucia-related articles** - Saint Lucia
- (France) Index of the Collectivity of Saint Martin-related articles - Saint Martin (French overseas collectivity)
- Index of Saint Pierre and Miquelon-related articles - Saint Pierre and Miquelon (French overseas collectivity)
- **Index of Saint Vincent and the Grenadines-related articles** - Saint Vincent and the Grenadines
- **Outline of Samoa** - Independent State of Samoa
- **Index of San Marino–related articles** - Most Serene Republic of San Marino
- **List of São Tomé and Príncipe-related topics** - Democratic Republic of São Tomé and Príncipe
- **Outline of Saudi Arabia** - Kingdom of Saudi Arabia
- **Outline of Scotland** - Scotland
- **Outline of Serbia** - Republic of Serbia
- **Outline of Seychelles** - Republic of Seychelles
- **Index of Singapore-related articles** - Republic of Singapore
- **Outline of Slovakia** - Slovak Republic
- **Outline of Slovenia** - Republic of Slovenia
- **Outline of the Solomon Islands** - Solomon Islands
- **Outline of Somalia** - Somalia
- **Outline of Somaliland** - Republic of Somaliland
- **List of South Africa-related topics** - Republic of South Africa
- Index of South Georgia and the South Sandwich Islands-related articles - South Georgia and the South Sandwich Islands (UK overseas territory)
- **Outline of South Korea** - Republic of Korea
- Outline of South Sudan - Republic of South Sudan
- **Outline of the Soviet Union** - Union of Soviet Socialist Republics (USSR)
- **Outline of Spain** - Kingdom of Spain
- **Outline of Sri Lanka** - Democratic Socialist Republic of Sri Lanka
- **Outline of Sudan** - Republic of the Sudan
- Outline of Svalbard - Svalbard (Territory of Norway)
- **List of Sweden-related topics** - Kingdom of Sweden
- **Index of Switzerland-related articles** - Swiss Confederation

== T ==
- **Outline of Taiwan** - Republic of China
- **List of Timor-Leste–related topics** - Democratic Republic of Timor-Leste
- Outline of Tokelau - Tokelau (Overseas territory of New Zealand)
- **Outline of Tonga** - Kingdom of Tonga
- **Outline of Transnistria** - Pridnestrovian Moldavian Republic
- **List of Trinidad and Tobago-related topics** - Republic of Trinidad and Tobago
- Outline of Tristan da Cunha - Tristan da Cunha (Dependency of the UK overseas territory of Saint Helena)
- **Outline of Tunisia** - Tunisian Republic
- **Index of Turkey-related articles** - Republic of Turkey
- **Outline of Turkmenistan** -Turkmenistan
- Index of Turks and Caicos Islands-related articles - Turks and Caicos Islands (UK overseas territory)
- **Outline of Tuvalu** - Tuvalu

== U ==
- **Outline of Uganda** - Republic of Uganda
- **Outline of Ukraine** - Ukraine
- **List of United Arab Emirates-related topics** - United Arab Emirates
- **Outline of the United Kingdom** - United Kingdom of Great Britain and Northern Ireland
- **Index of United States-related articles** - United States of America
- **Outline of Uruguay** - Eastern Republic of Uruguay

== V ==
- **Index of Vatican City-related articles** - State of the Vatican City
- **Outline of Vietnam** - Socialist Republic of Vietnam
- List of British Virgin Islands-related topics - British Virgin Islands (UK overseas territory)
- Index of United States Virgin Islands-related articles - United States Virgin Islands (US overseas territory)

== W ==
- **Outline of Wales** - Wales
- Outline of Wallis and Futuna - Territory of Wallis and Futuna Islands (French overseas community)

== Y ==
- **List of Yemen-related topics** - Republic of Yemen

== Z ==
- **Outline of Zambia** - Republic of Zambia
- **Outline of Zimbabwe** - Republic of Zimbabwe

== See also ==
- List of sovereign states
