= Rugby union in Saint Barthélemy =

Rugby union in Saint Barthélemy is a minor, but growing sport.

== Governing body ==
The governing body is the French Rugby Federation.

== History ==
Rugby was introduced to Saint Barthélemy by the French who colonised the area. More talented players tend to leave for Metropolitan France.

There have been occasional games against sides from the other Caribbean islands. Most of its rugby contacts are either with them, or with France itself.

One of the major teams on the island is "Les Barracudas", named after a ferocious fish of the Caribbean. They often play teams from Anguilla and other surrounding islands.

== See also ==
- Rugby union in France
