= Tintamarre (disambiguation) =

Tinatamarre is a word in Acadian French meaning "clangour" or "din", and may refer to:

- Tintamarre, an Acadian noisemaking tradition
- Tantramar Marshes, a National Wildlife Area in New Brunswick, Canada, named after the noisy flocks of birds which feed in the marshes
- Île Tintamarre, an uninhabited island administered by the French overseas collectivity Saint Martin
- A former name for areas of Middle and Upper Sackville, New Brunswick
- Tintamarre theatre company, a student theatre troupe at Mount Allison University in Sackville, New Brunswick
