= History of the Jews in Sint Maarten =

The history of the Jews in Sint Maarten (a constituent country of the Kingdom of the Netherlands located in the Caribbean region of North America) started before 1735, when two Jewish families already lived in Sint Maarten were most likely descendants of refugees that fled the Spanish Inquisition. A Jewish congregation existed by the 1780s. This community operated a synagogue that was located in Philipsburg, between Front Street and Back Street. After Hurricane San Mateo hit Sint Maarten on September 21, 1819, the synagogue was destroyed and the island's Jewish community dwindled (although the process probably started around 1800). Remnants of the synagogue can still be found behind what is now the Guavaberry Emperium on Front Street. Whether a Jewish cemetery existed in Philipsburg is debated. In the early 1850s, only 3 Jews lived in Sint Maarten. This was only 0.1% of the total population (the majority of the population, 56.8%, were slaves). Eventually, all Jews left the island.

Jews resettled on the island beginning in 1964. With the steady growth of the Jewish population and tourism on the island, initially, rabbis would visit for the holidays or for special occasions. Beginning in 2009, there has been a permanent rabbi on the island. The temporary synagogue was replaced by a new synagogue off Billy Folly Road in Simpson Bay. A daily minyan operates in the building, interrupted by the 2020 coronavirus pandemic in Sint Maarten. The number of Jews who permanently live on Sint Maarten has been estimated to number 200. The community provides services to Jews who live on Sint Maarten as well as Jews who visit it, the Collectivity of Saint Martin, and Anguilla. The Chabad branch also provides services to students and staff at the American University of the Caribbean on Sint Maarten. The neighboring island of Saint Barthélemy has had its own Chabad presence since 2015.
