= History of Saint Martin =

St. Martin's history shares many commonalities with other Caribbean islands. Its earliest inhabitants were Amerindians, followed by Europeans who brought slavery to exploit commercial interests.

== Early history ==
Ancient relics date the island's first settlers, going back 3,500 years ago. Then another group of Arawakan-speaking people migrated from South America's Orinoco basin around 800 A.D. Because of St. Martin's salt-pans they called it "Soualiga," or "Land of Salt." Mainly a farming and fishing society, the Arawakan-speaking people lived in villages of straw-roofed buildings which were strong enough to resist hurricanes. Their tranquil civilization valued artistic and spiritual pursuits.

Their lives were turned upside-down, however, with the descent of the Kalinago Indians from the same region they had come from. A warrior nation, the Kalinago killed the Arawakan-speaking men and enslaved the women. When Europeans began to explore the Caribbean, Kalinago society had almost completely displaced the earlier Arawakan-speaking population.

== Colonial era ==
In 1493, on Christopher Columbus second voyages to the West Indies, upon first sighting the island he named it Isla de San Martín after Saint Martin of Tours because it was November 11, St. Martin Day. However, though he claimed it as a Spanish territory, Columbus never landed there, and Spain made the settlement of the island a low priority.

The French and Dutch, on the other hand, both coveted the island. While the French wanted to colonize the islands between Trinidad and Bermuda, the Dutch found San Martín a convenient halfway point between their colonies in New Amsterdam (present day New York) and Brazil. With few people inhabiting the island, the Dutch easily founded a settlement there in 1631, erecting Fort Amsterdam as protection from invaders. Jan Claeszen Van Campen became its first governor, and soon thereafter the Dutch West India Company began their salt mining operations. French and British settlements sprang up on the island as well. Taking note of these successful colonies and wanting to maintain their control of the salt trade, the Spanish now found St. Martin much more appealing. The Eighty Years' War which had been raging between Spain and the Netherlands provided further incentive to attack.

Spanish forces captured Saint Martin from the Dutch in 1633, seizing control and driving most or all of the colonists off the island. At Point Blanche, they built Old Spanish Fort to secure the territory. Although the Dutch retaliated in several attempts to win back St. Martin, they failed. Fifteen years after the Spanish conquered the island, the Eighty Years' War ended. Since they no longer needed a base in the Caribbean and St. Martin barely turned a profit, the Spanish lost their inclination to continue defending it. In 1648, they deserted the island.

With St. Martin free again, both the Dutch and the French jumped at the chance to re-establish their settlements. Dutch colonists came from St. Eustatius, while the French came from St. Kitts. After some initial conflict, both sides realized that neither would yield easily. Preferring to avoid an all-out war, they signed the Treaty of Concordia in 1648, which divided the island in two. During the treaty's negotiation, the French had a fleet of naval ships off shore, which they used as a threat to bargain more land for themselves. The treaty was signed by the two governors of the island, Robert de Longvilliers for France and Martin Thomas for the States General of the Netherlands. The French would keep the north area they occupied and the coast facing Anguilla, while the Dutch would have the area of the fort and the land around it on the south coast. The inhabitants would share the natural resources of the island. In spite of the treaty, relations between the two sides were not always cordial. Between 1648 and 1816, conflicts changed the border sixteen times.

A fictional story about the 1648 border-drawing process is often told on the island to explain the larger French side: A Frenchman and a Dutchman were selected by their respective communities, given intoxicating drink, stood up back to back in Oysterpond, and set off to walk around the shoreline in opposite directions. The line between the starting and ending point was supposedly declared the border. The French side explains its larger territory by saying the Dutchman stopped to enjoy the company of a woman, or that the Frenchman chose wine and the Dutchman chose Jenever (Dutch Gin), which is supposedly heavier and required a nap. The Dutch side explains its smaller territory by accusing the Frenchman of cheating by running or taking a shortcut through the northeastern part of the island.

In 1651, the Compagnie des Îles de l'Amérique sold the French part of the island to the Order of Saint John which was sovereign over Malta, at the time a vassal state of the Kingdom of Sicily. The Order's rule lasted for fourteen years, and in 1665 it was sold back to the French West India Company along with the Order's other possessions in the Caribbean.

Although the Spanish had been the first to import slaves to the island, their numbers had been few. But with the new cultivation of cotton, tobacco, and sugar, mass numbers of slaves were imported to work on the plantations. The slave population quickly grew larger than that of the land owners. Subjected to cruel treatment, slaves staged rebellions, and their overwhelming numbers made them impossible to ignore. In 1848, the French abolished slavery in their colonies including the French side of St. Martin. Slaves on the Dutch side of the island protested and threatened to flee to the French side to seek asylum. The local Dutch authorities relented and emancipated the colonies' slaves. While this decree was respected locally, it was not until 1863 when the Dutch abolished slavery in all of their island colonies that the slaves became legally free.

== 20th century and beyond ==
After abolition of slavery, plantation culture declined and the island's economy suffered. In 1939, St. Martin received a major boost when it was declared a duty-free port. The Dutch began focusing on tourism in the 1950s. It took the French another twenty years to start developing their tourism industry. Currently, tourism provides the backbone of the economy for both sides of the island.

On September 5, 1995, Hurricane Luis severely pounded the islands causing numerous damages 35 years to the day after Hurricane Donna.

In 1994, the Kingdom of the Netherlands and France signed the Franco-Dutch treaty on Saint Martin border controls, which allows for joint Franco-Dutch border controls on so-called "risk flights". After some delay, the treaty was ratified in November 2006 in the Netherlands, and subsequently entered into force on 1 August 2007. As of 2016, due to Dutch-side objections to stricter French controls, the treaty has not been implemented; a working group has been meeting to negotiate details.

On September 6, 2017, Hurricane Irma, a Category 5 storm with sustained winds of over 180 mph (290 km/h), devastated the island, leaving severe damage. The Netherlands and France created different funds to restore the economy of the island. The Netherlands made available a fund of over 550 million euros which was managed by a recovery planning bureau also known as the NRPB.

The wake of hurricane Irma sped up a process of defining the exact border between the Dutch and French side. In some areas, this had remained unresolved. Especially the border through the waters of Oyster Pond had remained a binational bone of contention throughout the centuries. In 2023, a treaty was signed by officials of the Dutch and French side, the Netherlands and France.

One year later, Princess Juliana International Airport was officially reopened by HRH Princess Beatrix. Its rebuilding process after Irma had taken a very long time. The gesture was a symbolic one as the airport was named after her late mother in 1944.

== See also ==
- Collectivity of Saint Martin
- Culture of Saint Martin
- History of the Jews in Sint Maarten
- O sweet Saint-Martin's Land (bi-national song/anthem of Saint-Martin/Sint-Maarten )
- List of Designated Monuments in Sint Maarten
- Sint Maarten
