= Fort Louis (Saint Martin) =

Historic military fort in Marigot, St. Martin

- Marigot, Saint Martin
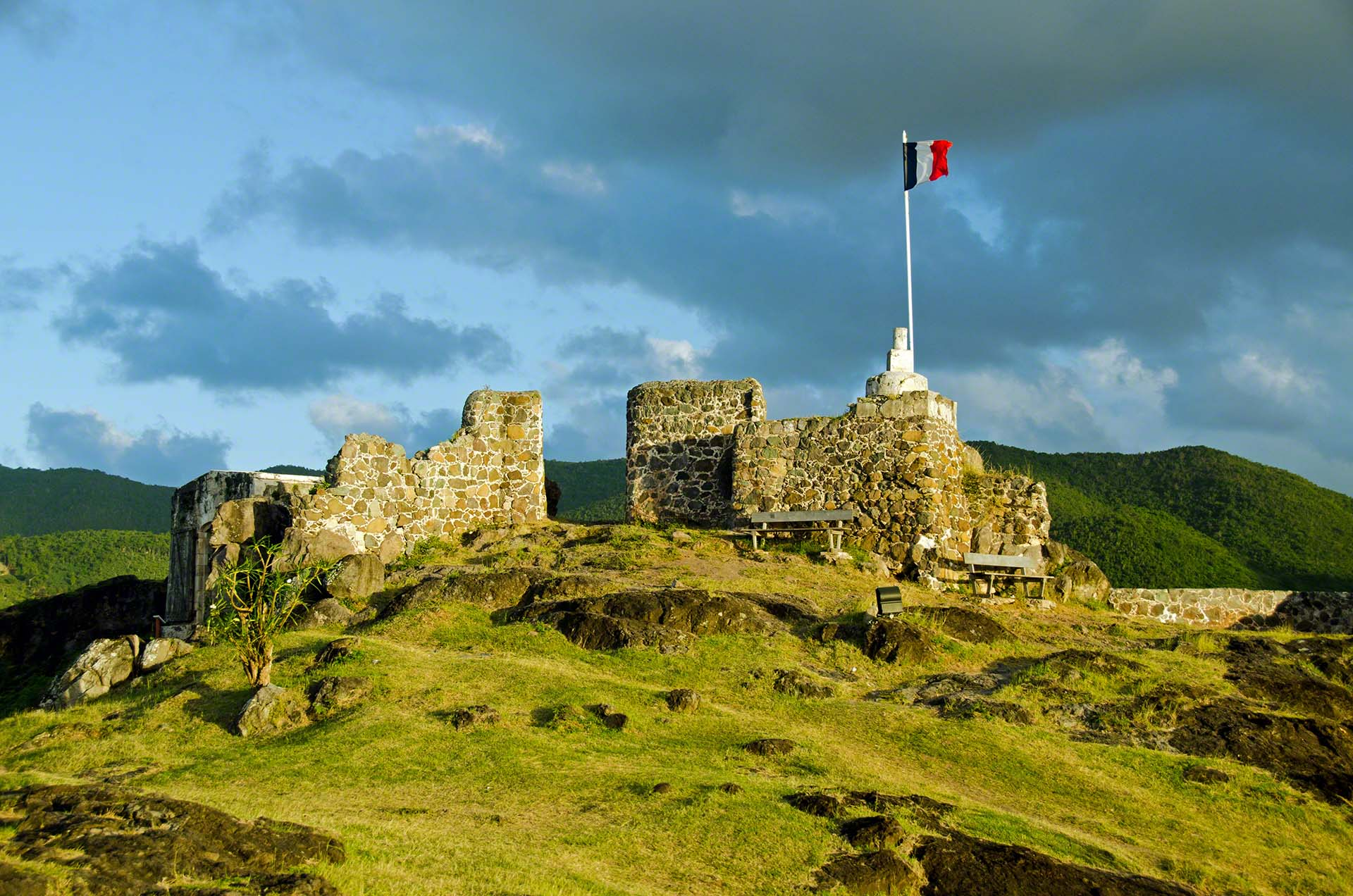
- Remains of Fort Louis, with French flag

Site information
- Type: Fortification
- Open to the public: Yes
- Condition: Ruins

Location
- Location within Saint Martin Fort Louis (the Caribbean)
- Coordinates: 18.070774°N 63.085404°W

Site history
- Built: 1789
- In use: No
- Materials: Stone

Fort Louis (or Fort St. Louis) is a historic French military fort on the Caribbean island of Saint Martin. It is located in Marigot, the capital of the French side of the island, overlooking Marigot Bay. The fort was built in the 18th century to defend Marigot's harbor and its warehouses. It was built during the reign of King Louis XVI.

== History ==
By 1765, batteries of canons were set up in three locations to defend Marigot's harbor: on the cliff of Pointe Bluff (pointe de Bluff), on Round Hill (Morne Rond), and on Marigot Hill (Morne de Marigot). A 1775 report written by Auguste Descoudrelles, commander of Saint Martin and Saint Barthélemy at that time, said that a fort on Marigot Hill would have helped Saint Martin defend its port, as the island had been prone to raids by the English.

In 1789, Jean-Sébastien de Durat, subsequent commander of Saint Martin and Saint Barthélemy, oversaw the construction of a fort, a prison, and a bridge in Marigot, under the orders of King Louis the XVI. The fort was built at the location of the Marigot Hill battery. Its purpose was to defend the warehouses in Marigot's harbor below, where local crops (such as coffee, salt, rum, and cane sugar) were stored. Durat named the fort Fort Louis, likely after Louis XVI, the French king he served under.

Originally Fort Louis was a wooden fort. By the beginning of the 19th century, the fort extended down the slopes of Marigot Hill with the construction of two additional batteries. While the fort was active, it had barracks for 54 troops. It had a guard room, a kitchen, and cistern.

It is possible that the fort was occupied by English troops while the English occupied the island of Saint Martin in 1781-1783, 1794, 1800 and 1810-1815. However, no evidence of English occupation of the fort has been found.

In 1851, the fort was abandoned and decommissioned by the military.

== Preservation ==
Between 1993 and 1994, restoration and enhancement work was undertaken by the Hope Estate Archaeological Association of Saint Martin (L'Association Archeologique Hope Estate), in cooperation the Military Service of Guadeloupe as well as the Departmental Archives in Basse-Terre, the National Overseas Archives in Aix-en-Provence.

== Gallery ==
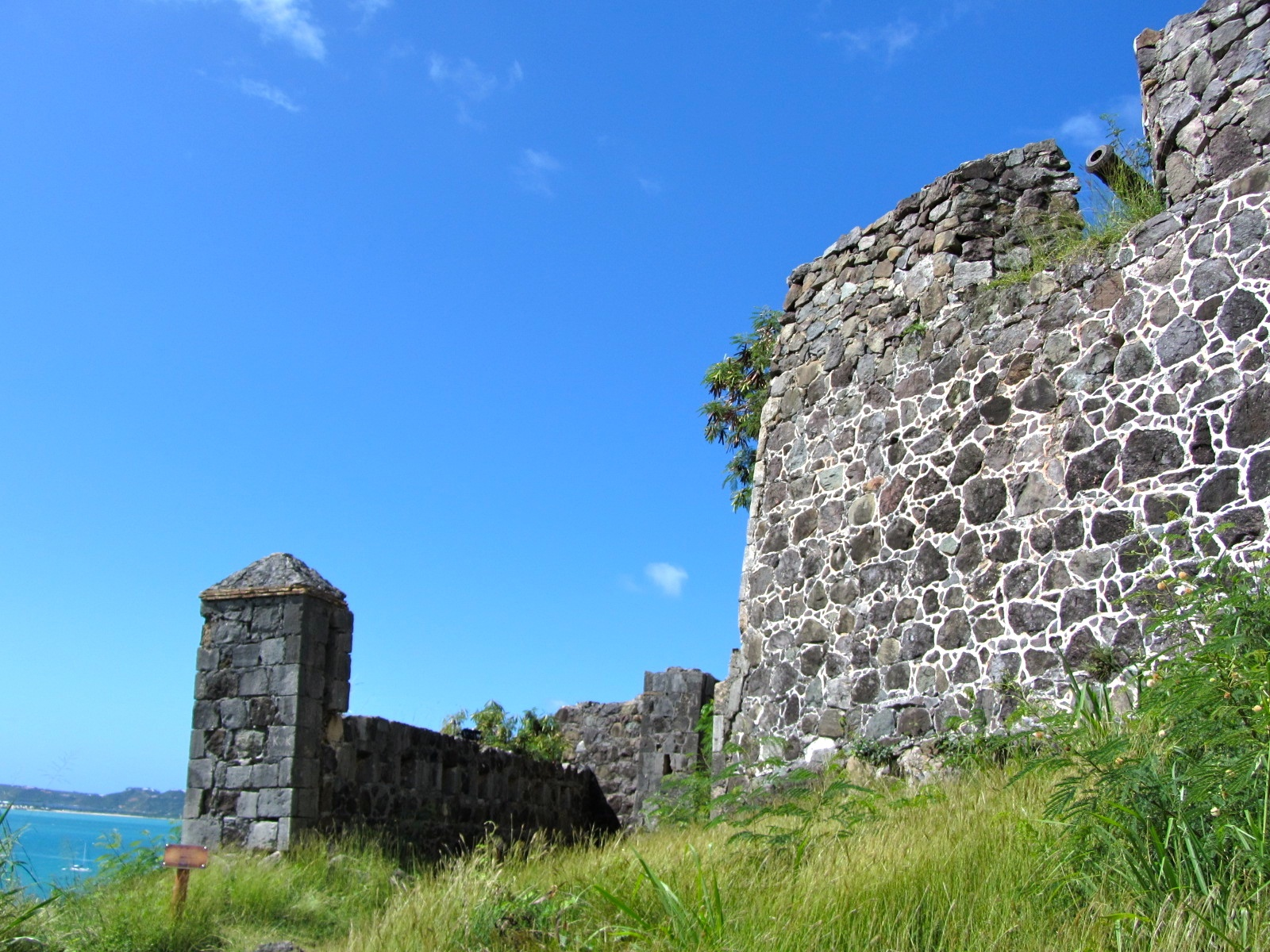
Fort entrance

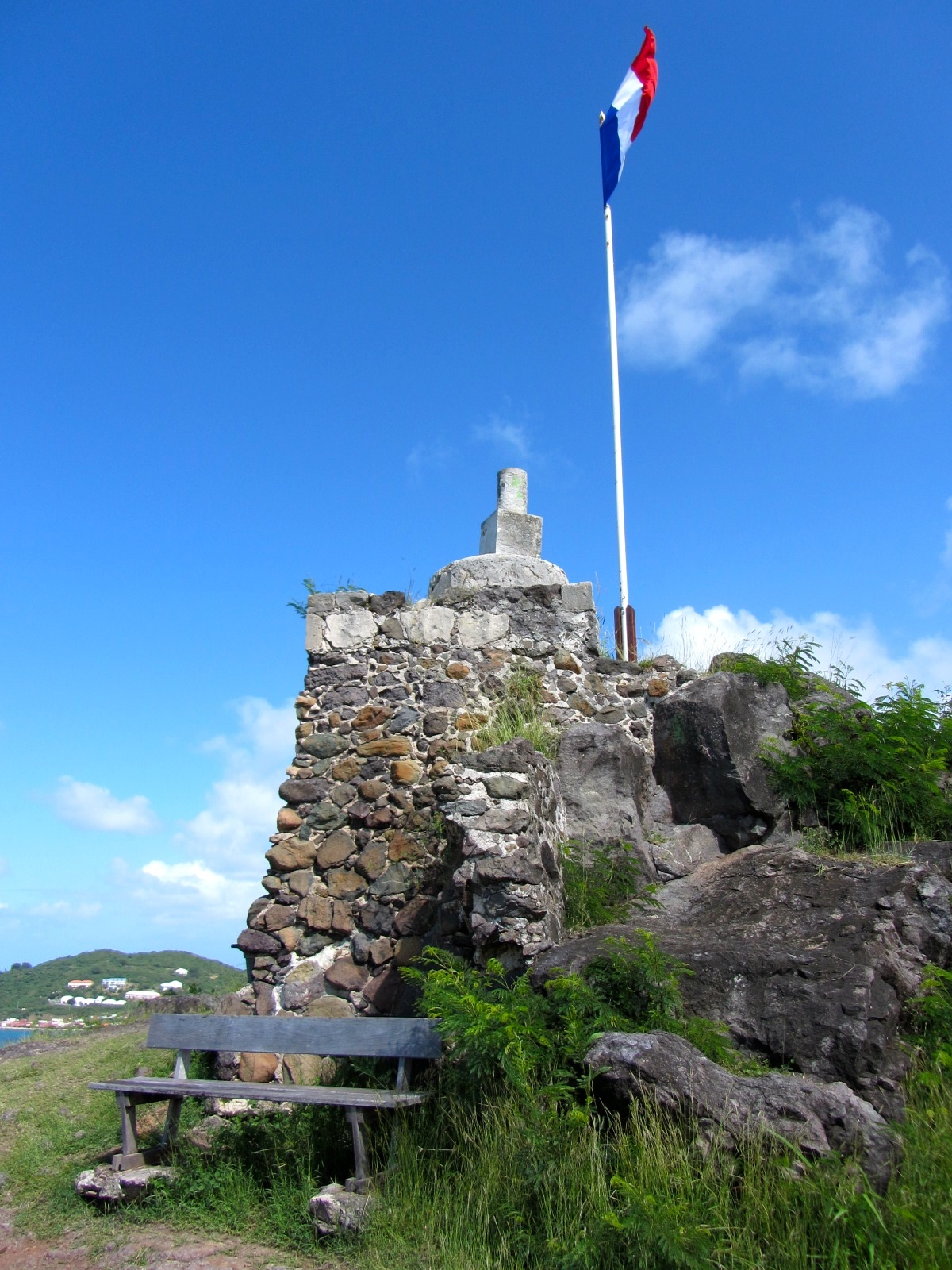
Fort summit, with French flag

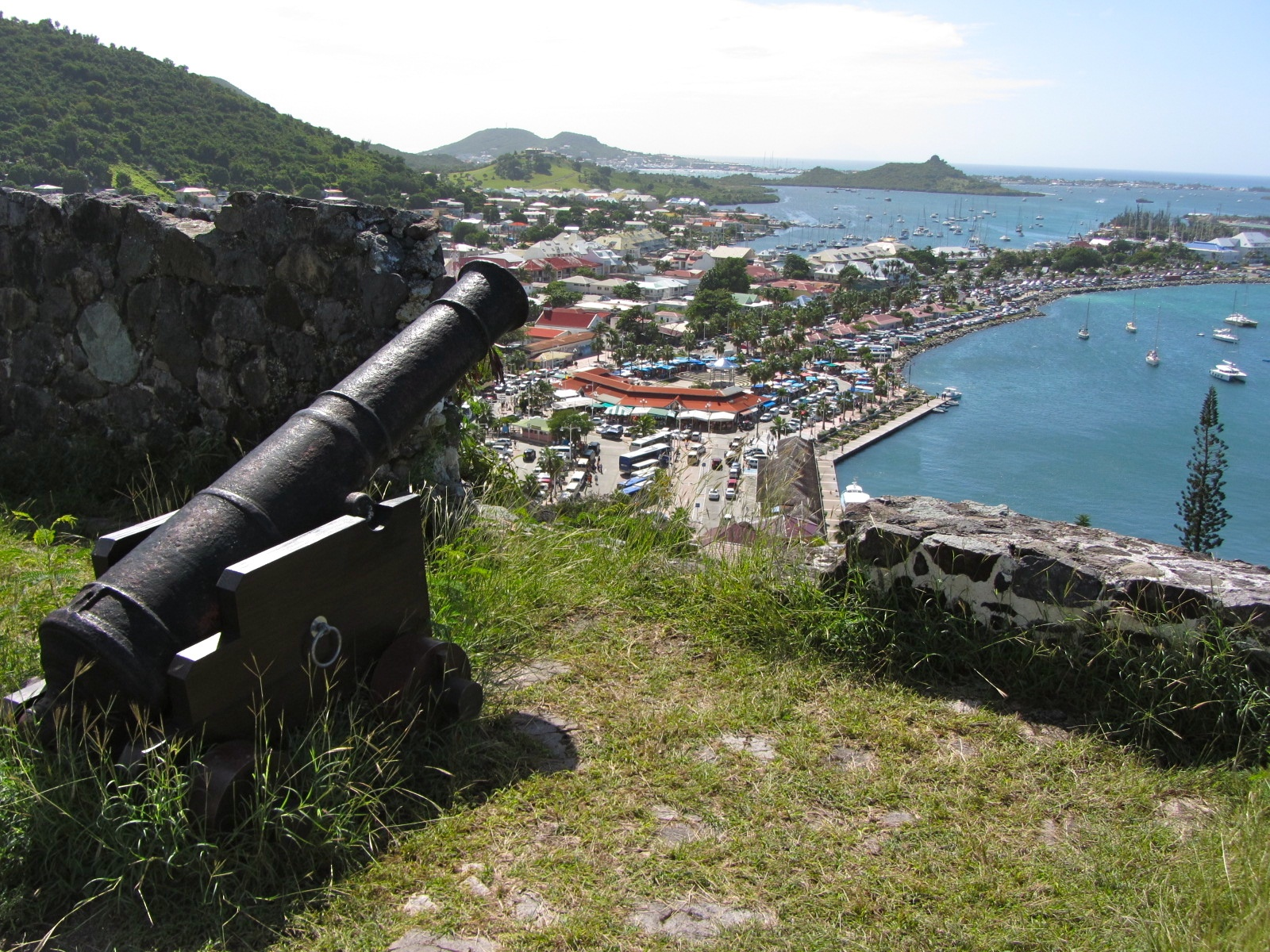
Canon, with view of Marigot Market and harbor below

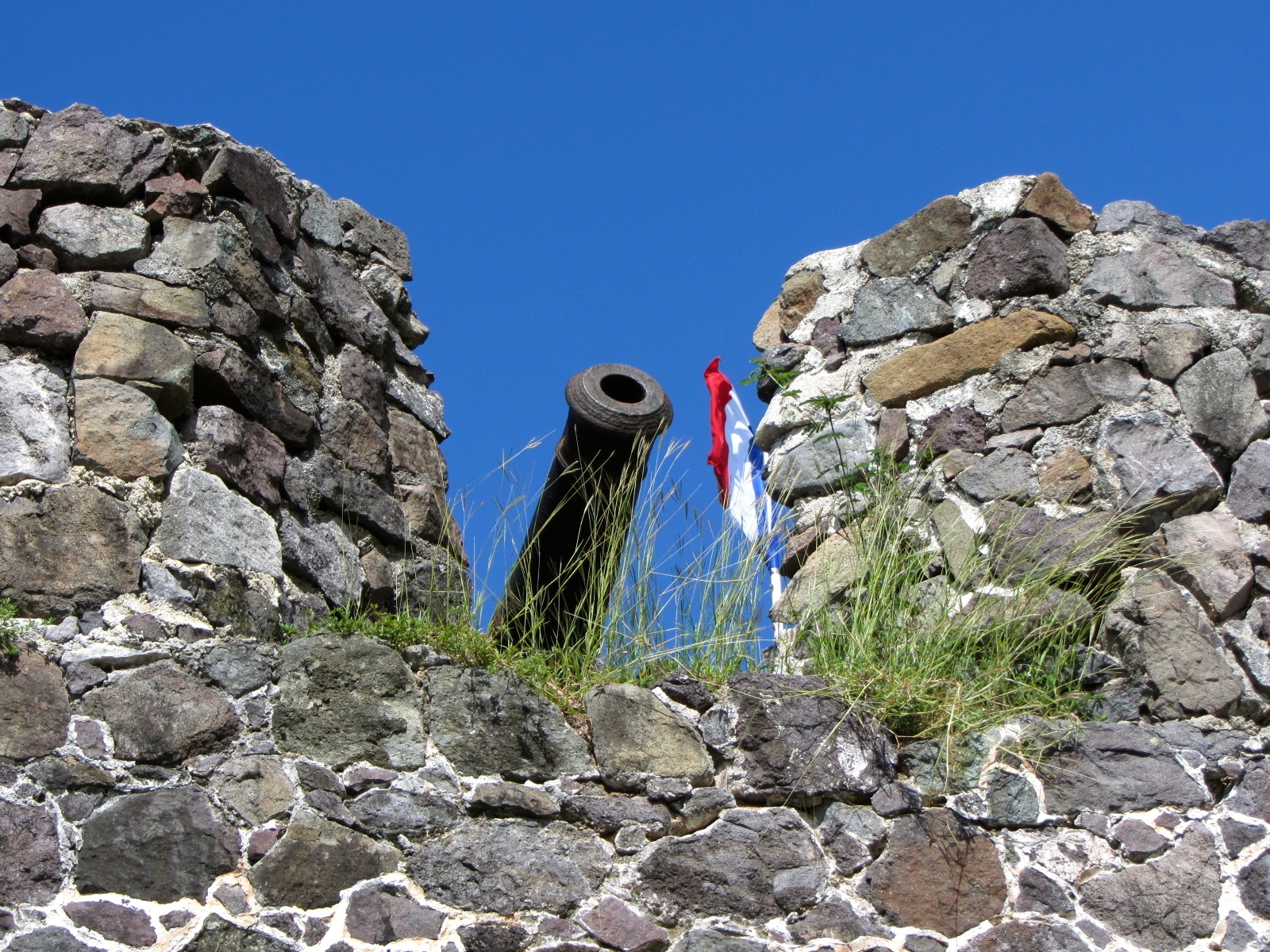
Embrasure and canon

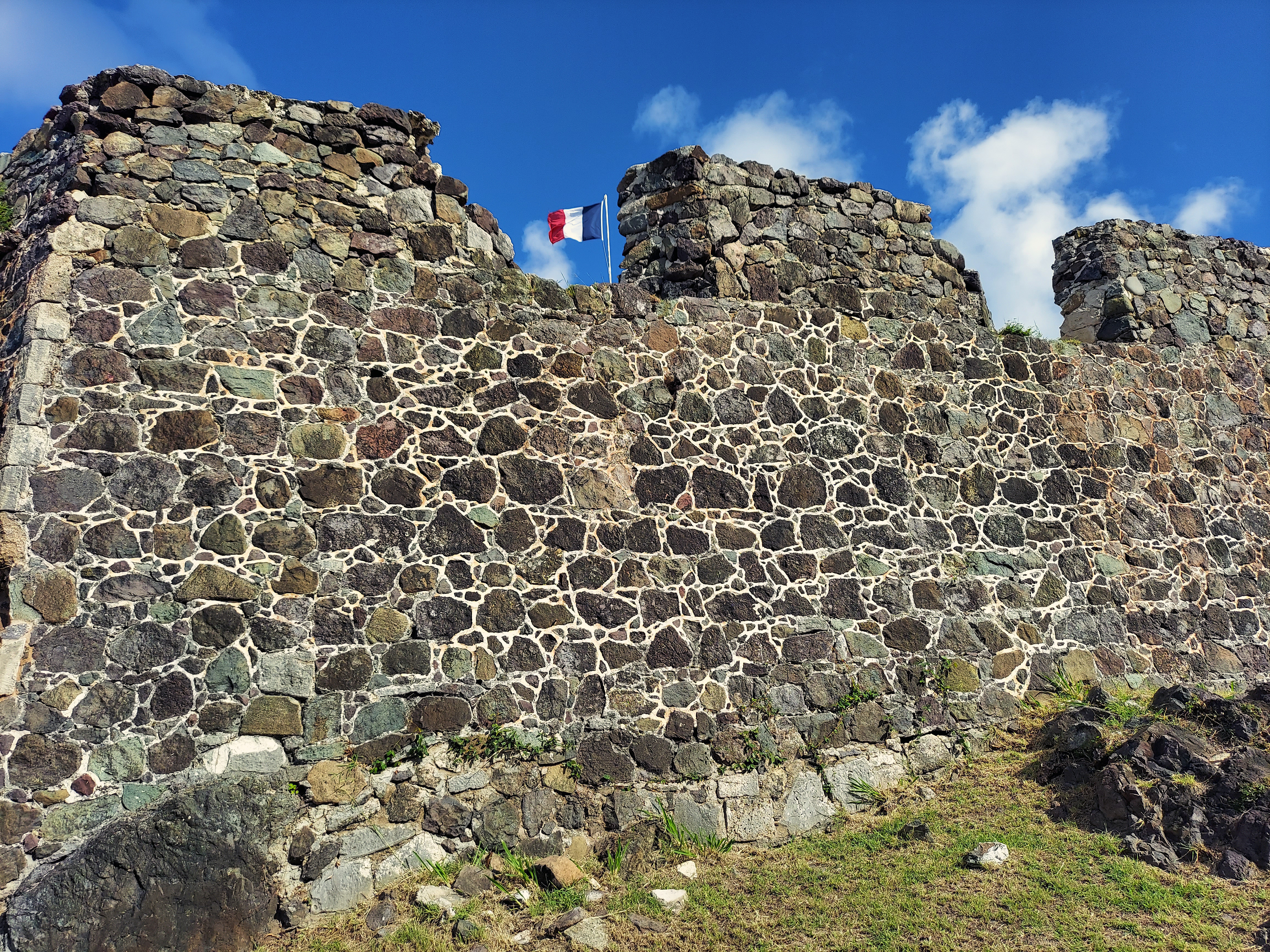
Exterior wall of Fort Louis

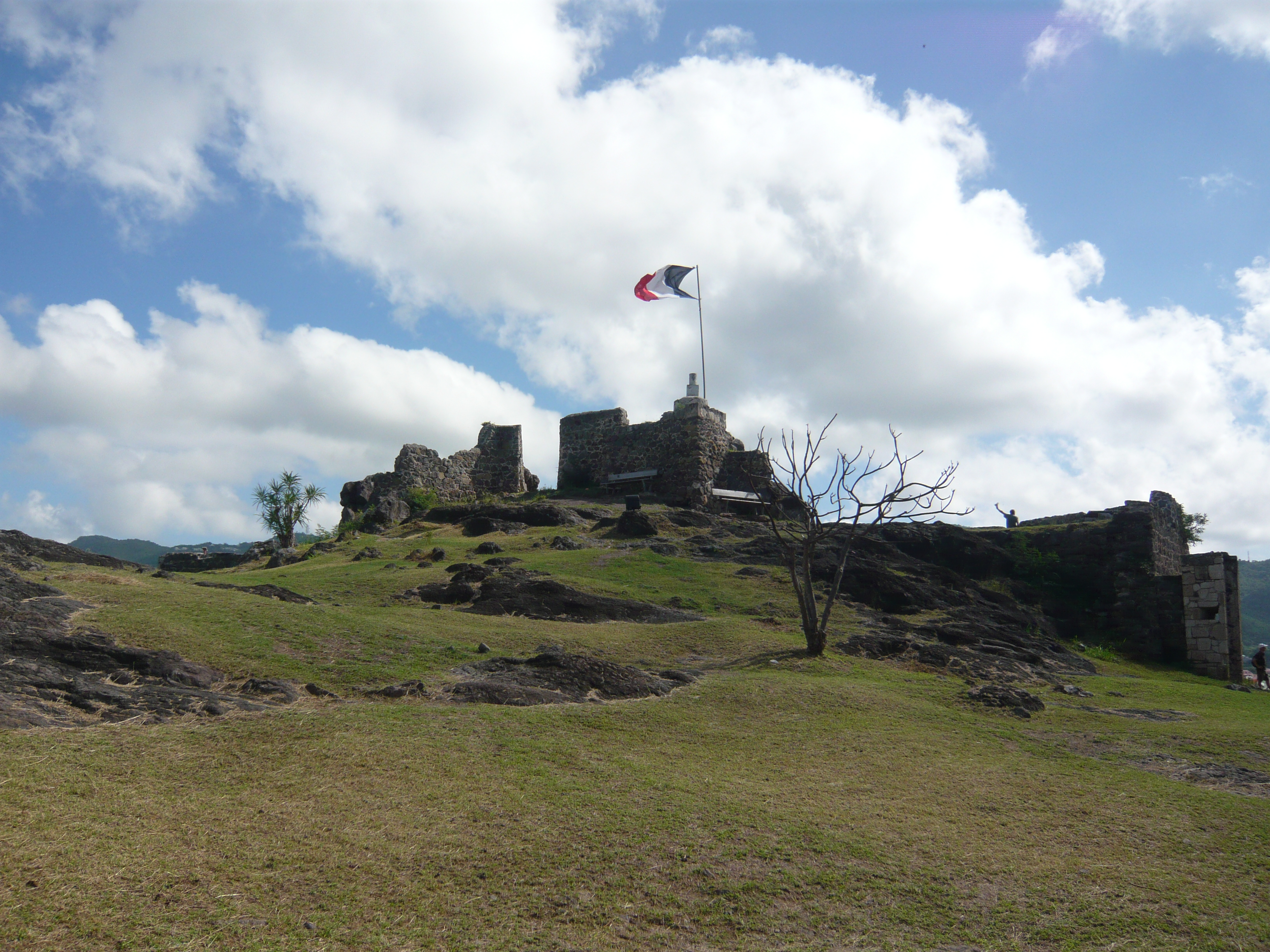
Fort Louis at the top of Marigot Hill
