= List of rivers of the Collectivity of Saint Martin =

This article presents a list of apparent watercourses on the island of Saint Martin in the Antilles. The island does not actually have any permanent rivers. However, erosion of the hills by rain has sculpted over time several gullies knowned here as ravines. These ravines are normally dry, but during periods of heavy rainfall, they channel water into powerful torrents (due to the steep gradients) that flood the plains below. The French side of the island, with its larger mountainous area, has numerous ravines, 17 of which are named after valleys, while the Dutch side has mainly two named ravines and one canal that collect and divert rainwater. In the past, many wells were dug in these ravines.

== French side : (by alphabétical order) ==
- Careta Ravine, flows into the Grand-Case salted marsh pond.
- Colombier Ravine, with its estuary at Friar's Bay.
- Concordia Ravine, with its estuary at Gallisbay.
- Duzant Ravine, with its estuary at Duck Beach (Anse Marcel).
- Frontier Ravine, flows into Oyster Pond.
- Grand Fond Ravine, flows into the Fish Pond (French Quarter).
- Hope Ravine, which joins Careta Ravine.
- Jone's Gut (a ghout) Ravine, flows into the Fish Pond. (French Quarter)
- Lottery Ravine, which joins Colombier Ravine.
- Paradise Ravine (Moho), joins Grand Fond Ravine. (French Quarter)
- Petit Fond Ravine, estuary at Orient Bay.
- Quartier Ravine, flows into the Fish Pond. (French Quarter)
- Red Rock (East) Ravine, flows into Grandes Cayes Bay (thru the landfill).
- Red Rock (North) Ravine, flows into Petites Cayes Bay (beach).
- Saint-Louis Ravine, flows into Guichard Pond. (by Rambaud)
- Spring Ravine, flows into Galisbay pond.
- Two Brothers Ravine, flows into the small Coralita pond (Lucas Bay).

== Dutch side ==
- Rolandus Canal, which encircles the Salt Pond in Philipsburg and flows into Great Bay.
- Ravine Rouge, with its estuary at Dawn Beach.
- South-Reward ravine, by the Zager's Gut, which flows into the Fresh pond. (Great Bay)
