= Rugby union in Saint Martin (island) =

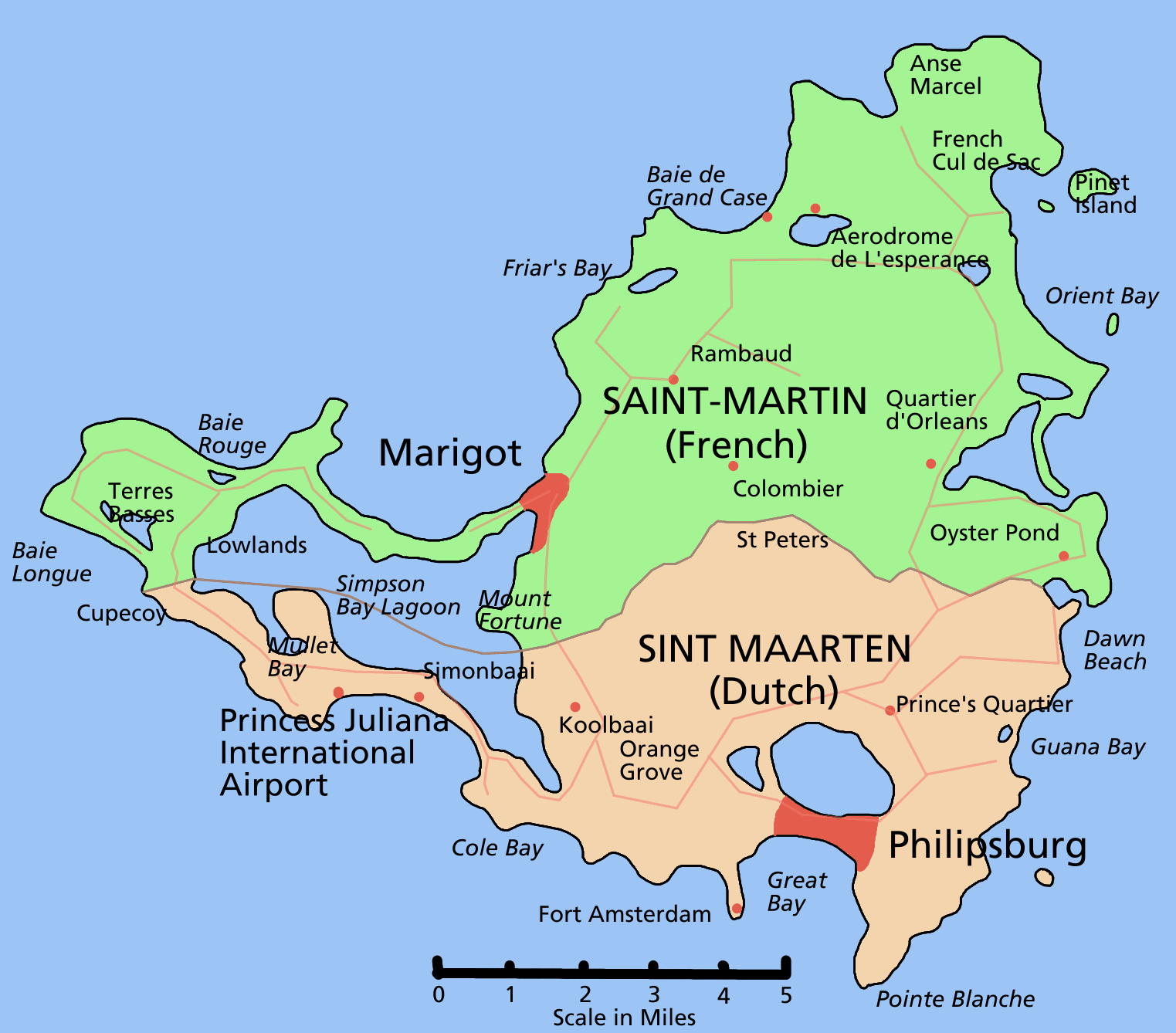
Map of the island showing the political division

Rugby union in Saint Martin is a minor but growing sport. The 87-square-kilometre (34 sq mi) island is divided roughly in half between France (53 km^{2}) and the Netherlands (34 km^{2}); it is the smallest inhabited sea island divided between two nations. There is free movement between the two parts of Saint Martin/Sint Maarten.

== Governing body ==
There are two governing bodies: the French Rugby Federation and the Netherlands Antilles Rugby Federation

== History ==
Rugby was introduced to Saint Martin by the French who colonised the area. More talented players tend to leave for Metropolitan France.

There have been occasional games against sides from the other Caribbean islands. Most of its rugby contacts are either with them, or with France itself.

Saint Martin had an annual rugby tournament. Anguilla Eels RFC were finalists in the Saint Martin tournament in November 2006 and semi finalists in 2007. Like many small islands, Saint Martin has a small population, which makes rugby development more difficult

The main sport is association football. On January 1, 2019 the population of the entire island was 73,606 inhabitants, 41,117 of whom lived on the Dutch side, and 32,489 on the French side. There are two main settlements, Marigot, and Philipsburg. RC Les Archiball and the St Martin Rugby Union are the two clubs in the French territory.

== See also ==
- Rugby union in France
