= Rugby union in Anguilla =

Independent Rugby Union

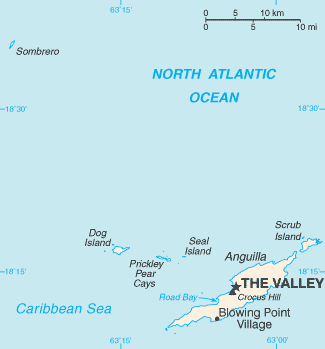
Map of Anguilla

Rugby union in Anguilla is a minor, growing sport. It is not ranked by World Rugby as it is not affiliated in its own right.

== Governing body ==
The governing body is not affiliated to NAWIRA or the IRB, although there have been link ups with the English Rugby Football Union.

== History ==
Rugby was introduced to Anguilla by the British who colonised the area.

Like many small islands, Anguilla has a low population. The main sport is cricket, and the national population is 13,477.

The main team is the Anguilla Eels RFC, who were formed in April 2006. The Eels have been finalists in the St. Martin tournament in November 2006 and semi finalists in 2007.

== See also ==
- Anguilla national rugby union team
