= Pic Paradis =

Mountain of Saint Martin in the Caribbean

- Paradise Peak
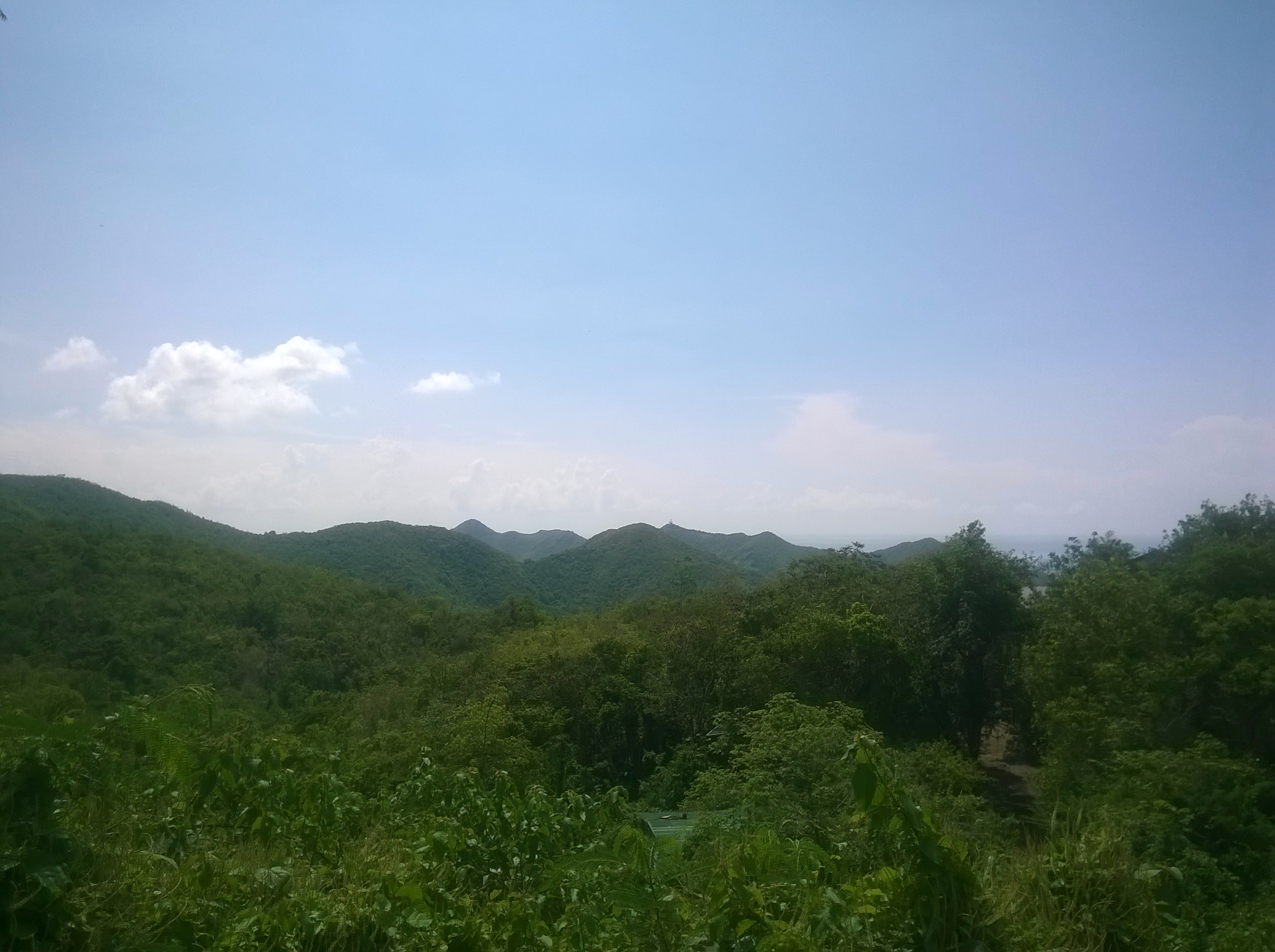

Highest point
- Elevation: 424 m (1,391 ft)
- Prominence: 424 m (1,391 ft)
- Coordinates: 18°04′39″N 63°03′00″W

Geography
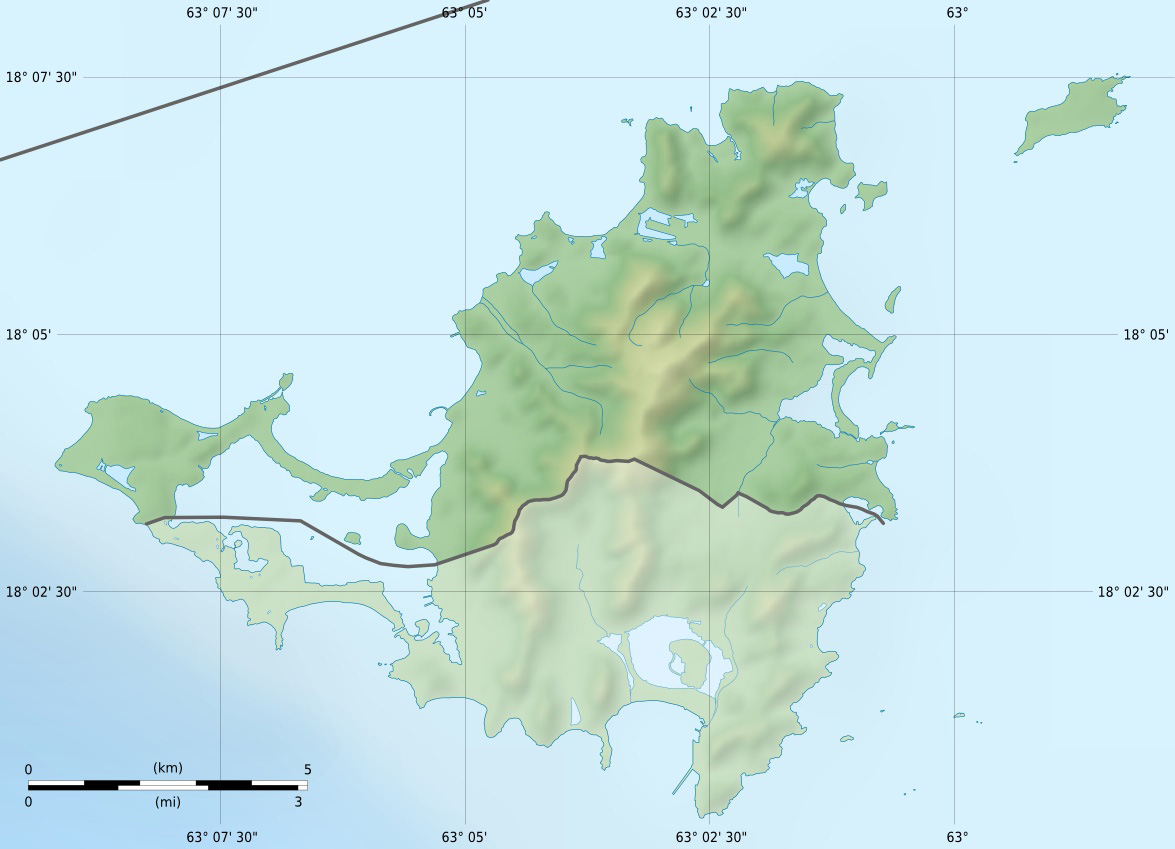
- Location within Saint-Martin
- Location: Saint Martin

Pic Paradis or Pic du Paradis (Paradise Peak in English) is the highest point in a chain of hills in the Collectivity of Saint Martin, an overseas collectivity of France on the island of Saint Martin, located in the Caribbean, with an elevation of 424 m (1,391 ft), making it the highest point on the island. It is an Important Bird Area (IBA) recognised by BirdLife International due to its importance for forest-dependent bird species native to the island.

== Description ==
Saint Martin is a Caribbean island in the Lesser Antilles; the island is split into the French overseas collectivity of the same name and the Dutch island country of Sint Maarten. Pic Paradis is a massif located in the French collectivity and is the highest peak on the hilly island, with the summit having an elevation of 424 m (1,391 ft). The island is densely populated on both the French and Dutch portions, leading to widespread deforestation of the native vegetation for the construction of human settlements. Historically, the island was also cleared for the large-scale cultivation of sugar, including at the La Loterie plantation on Pic Paradis.

Pic Paradis today, like the other hills on the island, provides the last remnant of secondary dry forests on the island. These forests have dense canopies with sparse undergrowth. The vegetation is dominated by mango and fig trees, the former growing to heights of 20 m (70 ft). Other trees in this forest include breadfruit, cacao, and royal palm. There may also be a small patch of remnant primary forest near Loterie Farm. The valley around this area also contains a seasonal stream and some small pools.

== History ==
In the 1700s, the Loterie Plantation, covering an area of 135 acres, was established on Pic Paradis. The area was operated as a sugar plantation until the end of slavery on the island in the mid-1800s, post which it was converted to a dairy farm. The dairy farm closed down in the 1960s; the land was subsequently bought by Nelly Fleming Engle and managed by William Welch to form an eco-tourism site, Loterie Farm. Today, it contains restaurants, treetop adventure courses, and a resort, with the upper reaches remaining unbuilt and managed for paid hiking trails. It is also the site of reforesting efforts aiming to restore native vegetation.

205 hectares of the site, covering an area from an altitude of 300 m to the summit, was recognised as an Important Bird Area (IBA) by BirdLife International in 2007 due to the massif's importance to terrestrial bird species on Saint martin. The lower boundary of the IBA is marked by Loterie Farm. Pic Paradis is entirely owned privately and is not protected by the government.

== Fauna ==
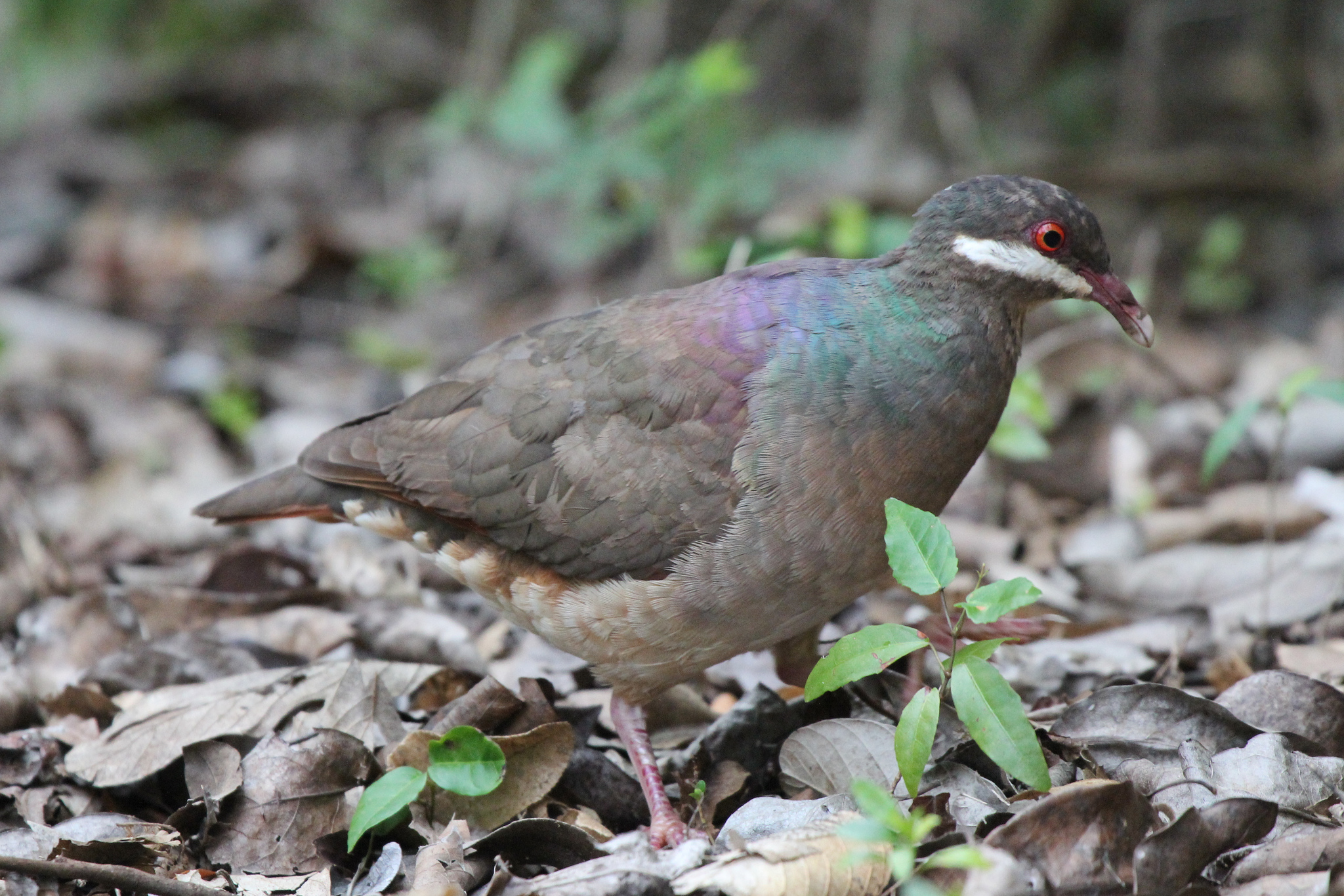
Bridled quail-doves are resident in the IBA

The IBA supports populations of bridled quail-doves, green and purple-throated caribs, Antillean crested hummingbirds, Caribbean elaenias, scaly-breasted and pearly-eyed thrashers and Lesser Antillean bullfinches. A 2004 winter survey of Pic Paradis found 29 species of birds to occur in an area of dry forest in Loterie Farm on Pic Paradis. 16 of these were migratory and 13 were residents. The survey found that the secondary dry forest on the massif was an especially important habitat for winter migrants to Saint Martin.

The massif provides important habitat for terrestrial gastropods on the island, especially in forests at elevations of 200–300 m (700–1,000 ft). Pleurodonte guadeloupensis martinensis, a subspecies of land snail endemic to the island of Saint Martin, was first discovered and collected from Pic Paradis.

Pic Paradis is one of the few parts of the island that harbour Antillean cave bats and Lesser Antillean tree bats.
