= O Sweet Saint Martin's Land =

Anthem of Saint-Martin / Sint Maarten

O Sweet St. Martin Land
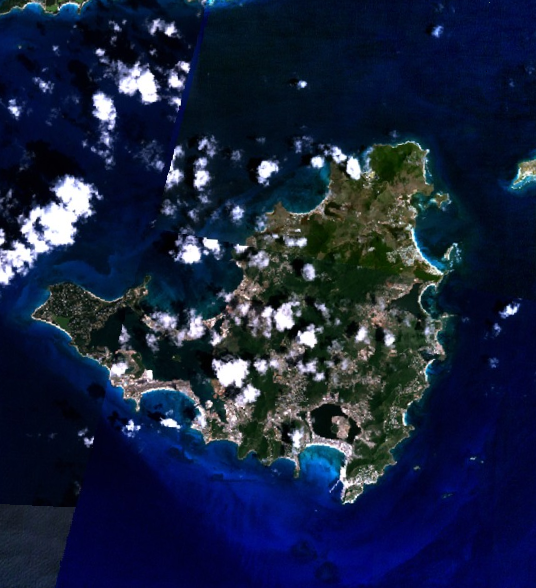
- Regional anthem of (France) Saint-Martin; Sint Maarten
- Lyrics: Gerard Kemps, 1958
- Music: Gerard Kemps, 1958

Audio sample
- Digital instrumental rendition of the English version: file; help

"O Sweet St. Martin Land", also known by its French title, "Saint-Martin, si jolie" ("Saint Martin, So Pretty"), is the bi-national song of Saint-Martin / Sint Maarten island, an island divided between the French Republic and the Kingdom of the Netherlands. It was written in English (the main language of Saint Martin) by Gerard Kemps in 1958. Kemps also wrote and composed a French version with its own lyrics and a different tune.

== History ==
After being appointed as priest for the Catholic Church of French St-Martin in 1954, Father Gerard Kemps felt compelled to compose lyrics and a melody about the beauty of the land of Saint Martin. In 1958, Kemps created "O Sweet Saint Martin's Land". Because of the message the lyrics conveyed and the melody that carried the tune, it served the purpose of an island-wide song.

In 1984, on the occasion of the Dutch Queen's Birthday, Kemps was knighted in the Order of Orange-Nassau.

A wide-hole 7-inch vinyl record (made in the Netherlands) was issued by Kemps & the Marigot Catholic Church choir.

== Lyrics ==
=== English version ===
I
Where over (Note: Sometimes written "in".) the world, say where,
You find an island there,
So lovely small with nations free
With people French and Dutch
Though talking English much,
As thee Saint Martin in the sea?

Chorus:
O sweet Saint Martin's Land
So bright by beach and strand
With sailors on the sea and harbours free
Where the chains of mountains green
Variously (Note: Sometimes written "colorful".) in sunlight sheen
𝄆 Oh I love thy Paradise,
Nature beauty fairly nice 𝄇 (Note: "Fairly" is sometimes written as "graceful", and the whole line is sometimes sung as "Nature's beauty very nice".)

II
How pretty (Note: Sometimes written "fine".) between all green
Flamboyants beaming gleam
Of flowers red by sunlight set
Thy cows and sheep and goats
In meadows or on roads
Thy donkeys keen I can't forget

Chorus

III
Thy useful birds in white
Their morn and evening flight
Like aircraft-wings in unity
Their coming down for food
Then turning back to roost
Bring home to me their harmony

Chorus

IV
Saint Martin I love thy name (Note: Sometimes written "I love Saint Martin's name".)
In which Columbus' fame
And memories of old are closed
For me a great delight
Thy Southern Cross the night
May God the Lord protect thy coast!

Chorus

=== French version ===
French original

I
Trouvez-moi une perle si chère,
comme l'île Saint-Martin en mer,
chaîne de mornes et vallées;
riche de plages bien dorées
qui donne la paix, donne le repos
dans ses mornes et toutes ses eaux.

Refrain:
𝄆 Saint-Martin, Saint-Martin,
Si jolie en tous ses coins! 𝄇

II
Quel charme ses flamboyants,
leur fleurs un enchantement,
tout un bouquet de flammes vives.
Quand le soleil ici arrive,
donnant splendeur, montrant beauté,
Quel éclat de tout coté.

Refrain

III
Sa cime "le Pic Paradis",
ravit les touristes ici,
d'où sa verdure fait merveille;
un panorama sans pareil,
voyant les plaines, voyant la mer,
colorée en bleu et vert.

Refrain

IV
Le vol de ses pélicans,
gracieux et si élégants
quand ils planent haut en l'air,
quand ils plongent dans la mer;
Dites-moi l'endroit, où on les voit,
lorsqu'ils fondent sur leur proie.

Refrain

V
Son nom toujours Saint-Martin
rest'ra dans l'histoire sans fin,
Christophe Colomb l'a découverte,
lui a donné son nom si cher,
Dieu protecteur, Dieu de bonté,
garde-la bien en prospérité !

Refrain

English translation

I
Find me a pearl so dear,
as the island of St. Martin in the sea,
chain of hills and valleys;
rich golden brown beaches
giving peace, give the rest
in its bleak and all its waters.

Chorus:
𝄆 St. Martin, St. Martin,
So pretty in all its corners. 𝄇

II
What his flamboyant charm,
their enchanting flowers,
a whole bunch of flames.
When the sun comes here,
giving splendor, showing beauty,
What splendor on all sides.

Chorus

III
Its top "Pic Paradis",
delights tourists here,
hence its green works wonders;
an unparalleled panorama,
Seeing the plains, seeing the sea,
colored blue and green.

Chorus

IV
Flight of its pelicans,
graceful and elegant
when they hover high into the air,
when they dive into the sea;
Tell me the place where we see them,
when based on their prey

Chorus

V
His name always St. Martin
Will in the never ending story,
Christopher Columbus discovered it,
gave it its name so dear,
Patron god, God of goodness,
guard it well in prosperity!

Chorus
