= Île Tintamarre =

Island in Saint-Martin, France

Native name: Île Tintamarre
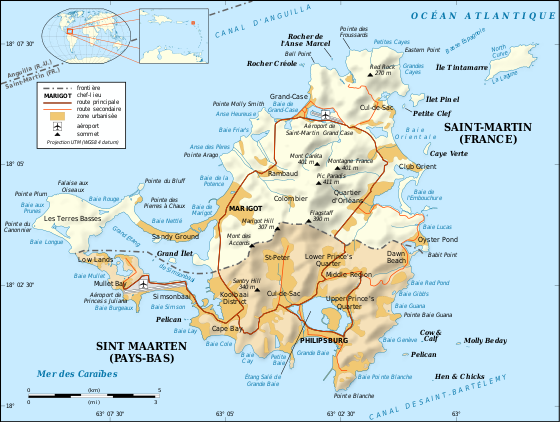
- Topological map of Saint Martin and Ile Taitamarre

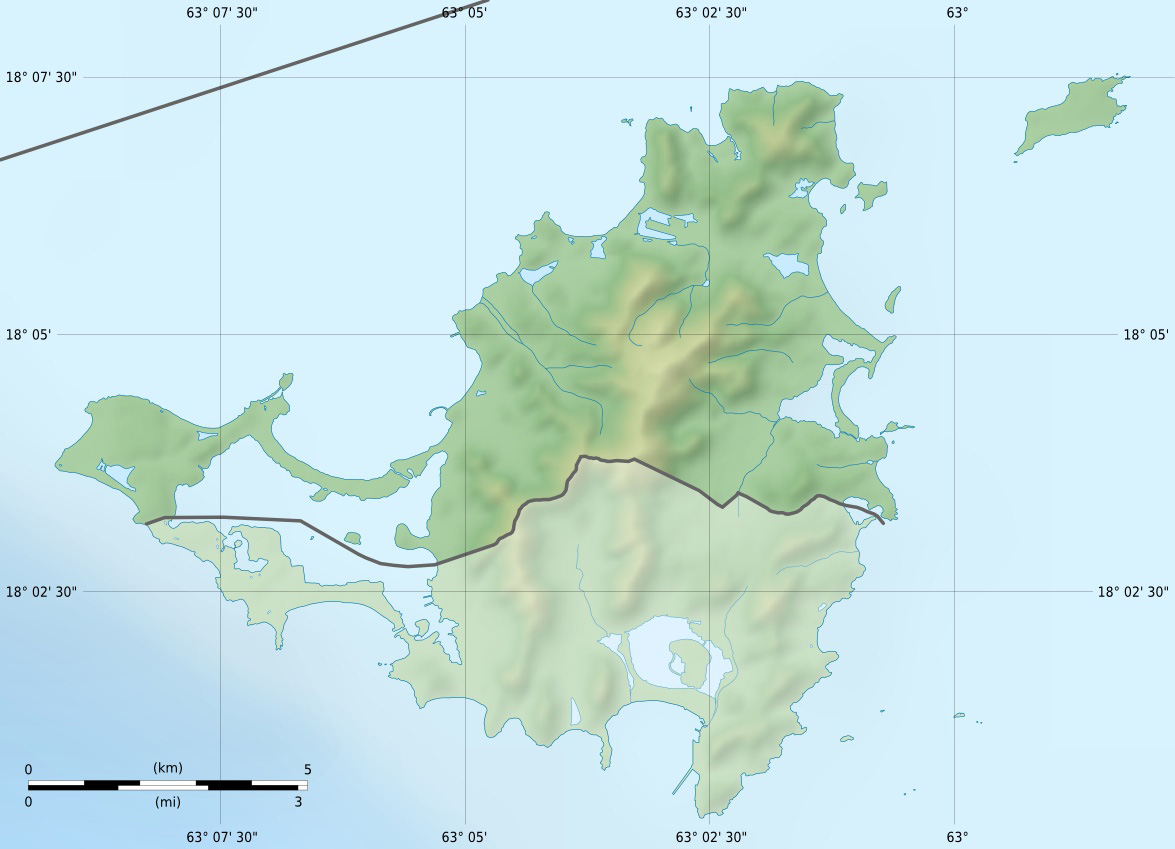
- Location within Saint-Martin Location within Lesser Antilles Location within the Caribbean

Geography
- Location: Caribbean Sea
- Coordinates: 18°7′10″N 62°58′50″W
- Archipelago: Lesser Antilles
- Area: 0.8 km^{2} (0.31 sq mi)

Administration
- Saint Martin

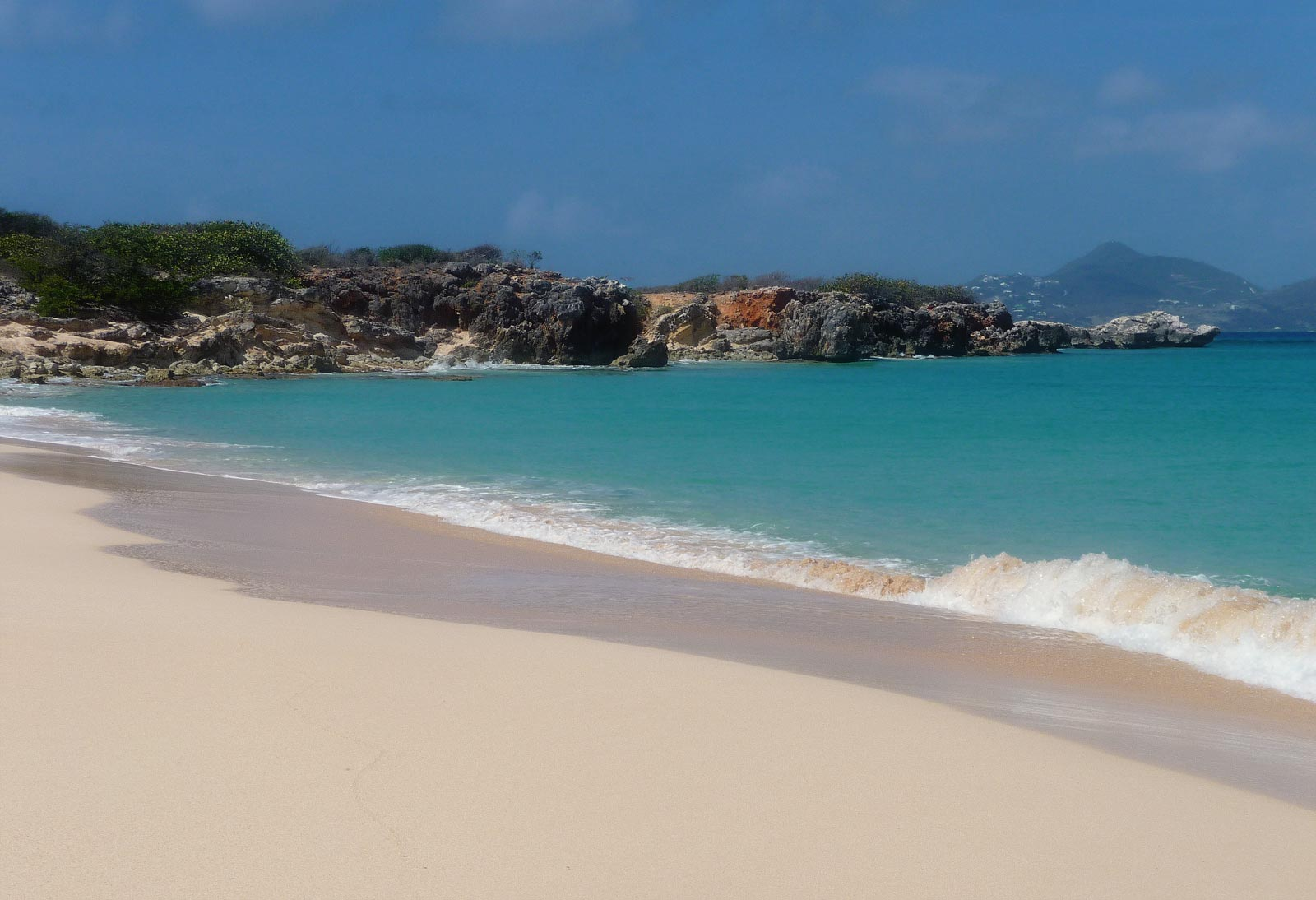
Tintamarre Island.

Île Tintamarre, also known as Flat Island, is a small island with an area of approximately 0.8 square kilometres (0.3 mi^{2}). It is located in the Caribbean Sea, about 3 kilometres (2 mi) from the island of Saint Martin, and is administered as part of the French overseas collectivity of Saint Martin. The island has no human occupants, but has been inhabited in the past.

For a long time, the island was property of the Dutch side St. Maarten family van Romondt - more specifically, entrepreneur Diederik Christiaan ("DeeCee") van Romondt. He ran a dairy farm with cows, goats, and sea cotton production. Parisian newspaper Le Journal, one of the most widely read daily newspapers of Paris, published an article about hermit DC van Romondt "Le Roi de Tintamarre" (The King Of Tintamarre") on August 23, 1913, leading to attention of female bachelorettes.

A contested aspect of the island’s history concerns whether German U-boats once used it as a station for resupply, recovery, and leisure. According to local lore, gold was exchanged for food and water. The most credible advocate of this theory is Sir Patrick Leigh Fermor, a former British wartime spy, who claimed in his 1950 book The Traveller’s Tree to have seen documents supporting it. While the tale is echoed in numerous oral histories, no written evidence has been verified.

Between 1946 and 1950, it was the base for a former airline, Compagnie Aérienne Antillaise, which flew planes from the island's 500-metre (1,600 ft) airstrip.

== Important Bird Area ==
A 665 ha area, encompassing the island and its surrounding waters, has been recognised as an Important Bird Area (IBA) by BirdLife International because it supports populations of green-throated caribs, Antillean crested hummingbirds, Caribbean elaenias, pearly-eyed thrashers and Lesser Antillean bullfinches, as well as seabird breeding colonies of red-billed tropicbirds and brown noddies.

== Bibliography ==
- Casius, Gerard J. (October 1996). "Les aviateurs de Tintamarre (1ère partie)" [The Pilots of Tintamarre]. Avions: Toute l'aéronautique et son histoire (in French) (43): 11–15. ISSN 1243-8650.
- Casius, Gerard J. (November 1996). "Les aviateurs de Tintamarre (2ème et dernière partie)". Avions: Toute l'aéronautique et son histoire (in French) (44): 33–36. ISSN 1243-8650.
