= Collectivity of Saint Martin =

Overseas collectivity of France

Coordinates: 18°4′31″N 63°3′36″W

Saint Martin Saint-Martin (French)
- Overseas collectivity of France and outermost region of the European Union
- Collectivity of Saint Martin; Collectivité de Saint-Martin
- Flag Emblem
- Anthem: La Marseillaise ("The Marseillaise")
- Territorial anthem: "Saint-Martin, si jolie"
- Location of Saint Martin in the Leeward Islands

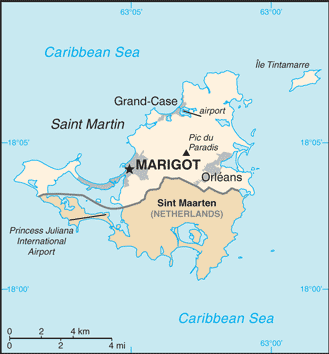
- Saint Martin is located on the northern half of the island of Saint Martin.
- Sovereign state: France
- Partition of island: 23 March 1648
- Separated from Guadeloupe: 15 July 2007
- Capital and largest city: Marigot
- Official languages: French
- Common languages: Saint Martin's English
- Demonym(s): Saint-Martinois
- Government: Devolved parliamentary dependency
  - President of France: Emmanuel Macron
  - Prefect: Cyrille Le Vély
  - President of the Territorial Council: Louis Mussington
- Legislature: Territorial Council

French Parliament
  - Senate: 1 senator (of 348)
  - National Assembly: 1 seat shared with Saint Barthélemy (of 577)

Area
  - Total: 53.2 km^{2} (20.5 sq mi)
  - Water (%): negligible

Population
  - Jan. 2021 census: 31,477
  - Density: 592/km^{2} (1,533.3/sq mi)
- GDP (nominal): 2014 estimate
  - Total: US$771.9 million (€581.8 million)
  - Per capita: US$21,987 (€16,572)
- Currency: Euro (€) (EUR); unofficially: United States dollar (US$) (USD)
- Time zone: UTC-4:00 (AST)
- Driving side: Right
- Calling code: +590
- INSEE code: 978
- ISO 3166 code: MF; FR-MF
- Internet TLD: .mf; .fr; .gp

The Collectivity of Saint Martin (French: Collectivité de Saint-Martin), commonly known as simply Saint Martin (Saint-Martin, [sɛ̃ maʁtɛ̃]), is an overseas collectivity of France in the West Indies in the Caribbean, on the northern half of the island of Saint Martin, as well as some smaller adjacent islands. Saint Martin is separated from the island of Anguilla by the Anguilla Channel. Its capital is Marigot.

With a population of 31,477 as of January 2021 on an area of 53.2 square kilometres (20.5 sq mi), it encompasses the northern 60% of the divided island of Saint Martin, and some neighbouring islets, the largest of which is Île Tintamarre. The southern 40% of the island of Saint Martin constitutes Sint Maarten, which has been a constituent country of the Kingdom of the Netherlands since 2010 following the dissolution of Netherlands Antilles. This marks the only place in the world where France borders the Netherlands.

Before 2007, the French part of Saint Martin was a commune belonging to the French overseas department and region of Guadeloupe. Despite seceding from Guadeloupe in 2007 and gaining more autonomy as an overseas collectivity of France, Saint Martin has remained an outermost region of the European Union and is part of the eurozone. For statistical purposes, it is still included in the NUTS 2 (FRY1) and NUTS 3 (FRY10) of Guadeloupe by Eurostat.

== Etymology ==
Due to confusion on early maps, the island accidentally got the name intended for Nevis by Christopher Columbus in honour of St Martin of Tours because he first sighted it on the saint's feast day on 11 November 1493.

== History ==
=== Pre-colonial ===
Archaeological evidence indicates that Saint Martin was inhabited by Amerindian peoples as early as 2000 BC. The earliest known settlers were Archaic Age hunter-gatherers, followed by the Saladoid culture, who arrived around 550 BC from the Orinoco River basin, introducing agriculture and pottery. These communities established villages, such as the one at Hope Estate, which remained occupied until approximately 650 AD. Around 1300–1400 AD, the island saw the arrival of the Kalinago (Carib) people, who began to displace the earlier Arawak inhabitants.

=== Arrival of Europeans ===
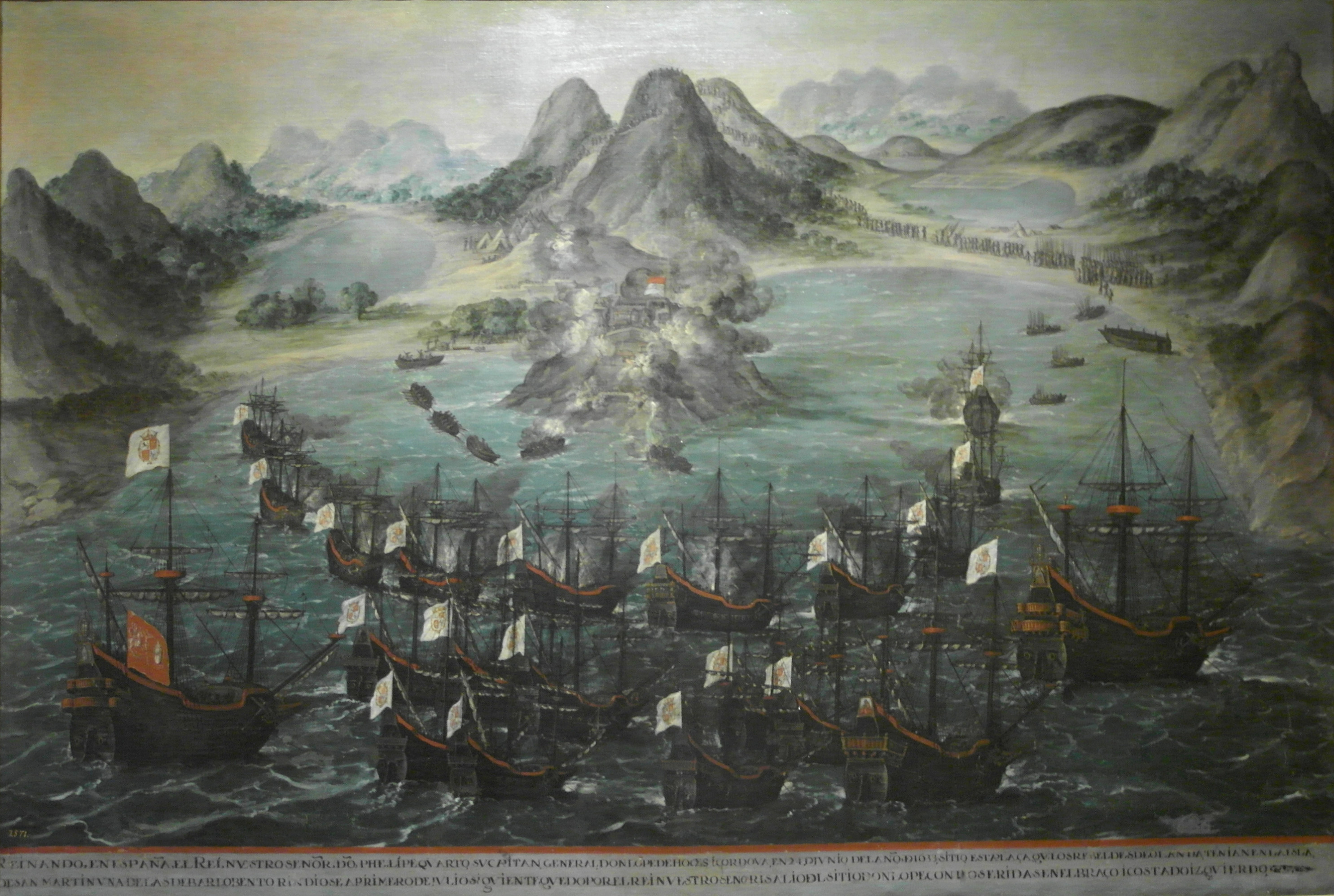
The 1633 Spanish capture of Saint Martin, as painted by Juan de la Corte

It is commonly believed that Christopher Columbus named the island in honor of Saint Martin of Tours when he encountered it on his second voyage of discovery. However, he actually applied the name to the island now called Nevis when he anchored offshore on 11 November 1493, the feast day of Saint Martin. The confusion of numerous poorly charted small islands in the Leeward Islands meant that this name was accidentally transferred to the island now known as Saint-Martin.

Nominally a Spanish territory, the island became the focus of the competing interest of the European powers, notably France and the United Provinces. Meanwhile, the Amerindian population began to decline precipitously, dying from diseases brought by the Europeans.

In 1631, the Dutch built Fort Amsterdam on Saint Martin and the Dutch West India Company began mining salt there. Tensions between the Netherlands and Spain were already high due to the ongoing Eighty Years' War, and in 1633 the Spanish captured St Martin and drove off the Dutch colonists. The Dutch, under Peter Stuyvesant, attempted to regain control in 1644 but were unsuccessful. However, in 1648 the Eighty Years' War ended and the island lost its strategic and economic value to Spain. The Spanish abandoned it and the Dutch returned. The French also began settling, and rather than fight for control of the entire island the two powers agreed to divide it in two with the Treaty of Concordia. The first governor of French Saint Martin was Robert de Longvilliers. Various adjustments to the precise alignment of the border occurred, with the boundary settling at its current position by 1817.

=== 18th–19th centuries ===
During the 18th century, the French and Dutch developed cotton, tobacco, and sugar plantations on the island, leading to the importation of a significant number of African slaves, who eventually outnumbered the European settlers. The French abolished slavery on 28 May 1848, following a decree by the provisional government. This led to immediate repercussions on the Dutch side; for instance, the entire enslaved population of the Diamond Estate Plantation fled to the French side, where they were recognized as free individuals. The Dutch abolished slavery later, on 1 July 1863. Meanwhile, In 1763, Saint Martin was administratively merged into France's Guadeloupe colony.

=== 20th–21st centuries ===
By the first decades of the 20th century Saint Martin's economy was in a poor state, prompting many to emigrate. Things improved during the Second World War as the Americans built an airstrip on the Dutch side of the island.

In 1946 Saint Martin (along with Saint Barthélemy) was formally subsumed as an arrondissement into the Guadeloupe département. Tourism started expanding from the 1960s–70s onward, eventually becoming the dominant sector of Saint Martin's economy.

Hurricane Luis hit the island in 1995, causing immense destruction and resulting in 12 deaths.

In 2007 Saint Martin was detached from Guadeloupe and became a territorial collectivity with its own Prefect and Territorial Council.

In 2017, Saint Martin was again devastated by a hurricane, Irma, causing widespread destruction across the entire island.

== Geography ==
Topographic map of the island of Saint Martin

The Collectivity of Saint Martin occupies the northern half of the island of Saint Martin in the Leeward Islands; the southern half forms the Dutch territory of Sint Maarten. To the north across the Anguilla Channel lies the British Overseas Territory of Anguilla, to the south-east of the island lies the French island of Saint Barthélemy and further south are the Dutch islands of Saba and Sint Eustatius.

Saint Martin's land area is 53.2 km^{2} (20.5 mi^{2}) The terrain is generally hilly, with the highest peak being Pic Paradis at 424 m (1,391 ft), which is also the highest peak on the island as a whole. The Terres Basses region lying west of the capital Marigot, which contains the French half of the Simpson Bay Lagoon, is flatter. There are a few small lakes on Saint Martin, such as Chevrise Pond, Great Pond and Red Pond. The land is part of the Leeward Islands xeric scrub ecoregion.

Numerous small islands lie off the coast, including Rock of the Cove Marcel, Creole Rock, Little Key, Pinel Island, Green Cay Grand Islet (within the Simpson Bay Lagoon) and the largest Tintamarre Island.

=== Hurricane Irma ===
Hurricane Irma hit Saint Martin on 6 September 2017; 95% of the structures on the French side were damaged or destroyed. Looting or "pillaging" was a problem initially; France subsequently sent 240 gendarmes to help control the situation.

On 11 September President Emmanuel Macron visited St Martin to view the damage and to assure residents of support for relief efforts. At that time, only tourists and visitors from France (mainlanders) had been evacuated from St. Martin, leading to complaints by black and mixed-race residents that whites were being given priority. Macron pledged 50 million euros of aid for the French islands and said the rebuilding will be done quickly but very well. By March 2018 much of the territory's infrastructure was back up and running.

== Politics and government ==
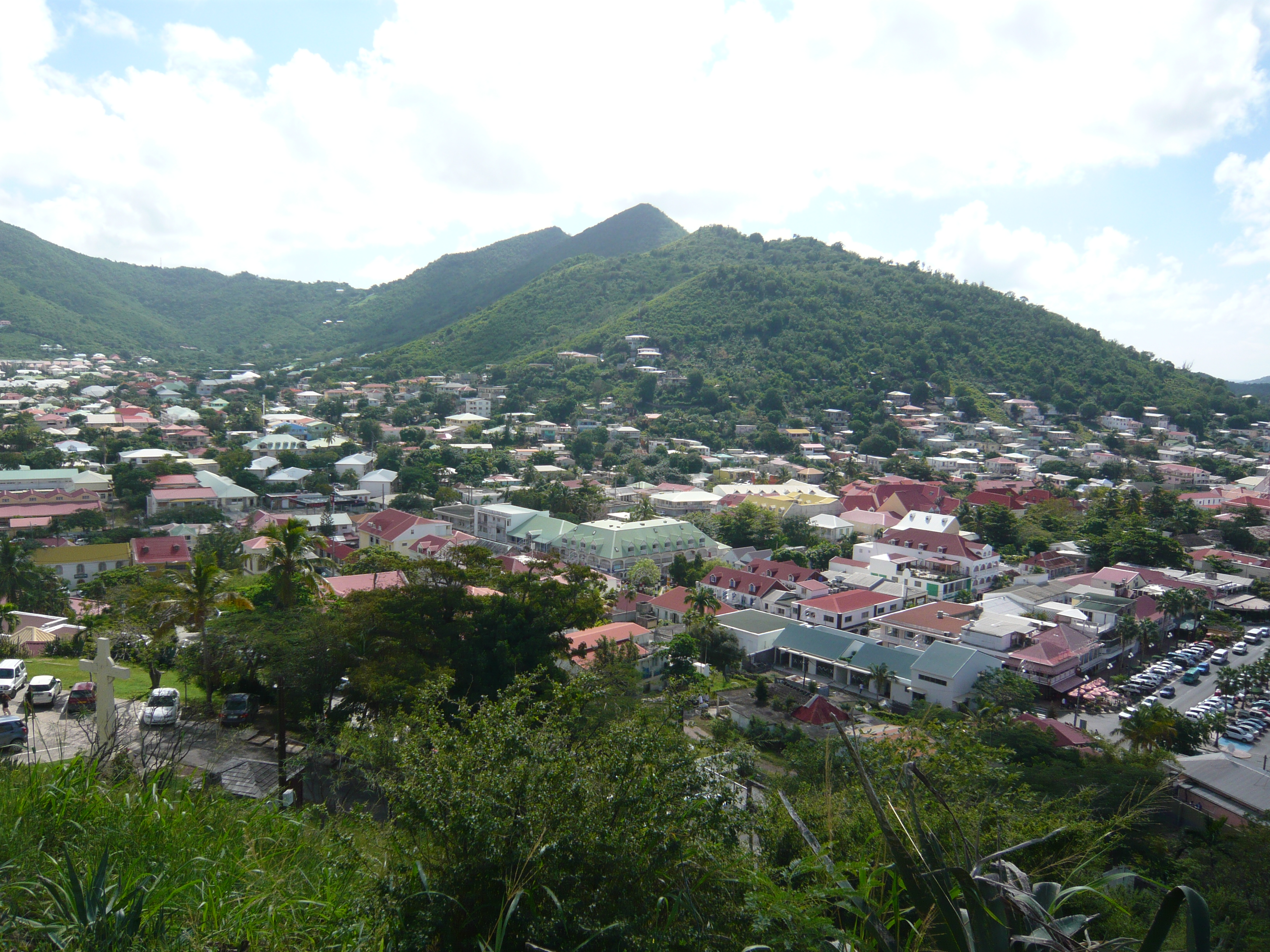
View of the capital Marigot from Fort St. Louis

Saint Martin was for many years a French commune, forming part of Guadeloupe, which is an overseas région and département of France. In 2003 the population of the French part of the island voted in favour of secession from Guadeloupe in order to form a separate overseas collectivity (COM) of France. On 9 February 2007, the French Parliament passed a bill granting COM status to both the French part of Saint Martin and (separately) the neighbouring Saint Barthélemy. The new status took effect on 15 July 2007, once the local assemblies were elected, with the second round of the vote ultimately occurring on 15 July 2007. Saint Martin remains part of the European Union.

The new governance structure befitting an overseas collectivity took effect on 15 July 2007 with the first session of the Territorial Council (French: Conseil territorial). This is a unicameral body of 23 members, with elections held every five years. The first President of the Territorial Council was Louis-Constant Fleming, however on 25 July 2008 Fleming resigned after being sanctioned by the Conseil d'État for one year over problems with his 2007 election campaign. On 7 August, Frantz Gumbs was elected as President of the Territorial Council. However, his election was declared invalid on 10 April 2009 and Daniel Gibbs appointed as Acting President of the Territorial Council on 14 April 2009. Gumbs was re-elected on 5 May 2009.

The Chief of State is the President of France (currently Emmanuel Macron), who is represented locally by a Prefect appointed on the advice of the Minister of the Interior (France). The current Prefect is Sylvie Feucher. Saint Martin elects one member to the French Senate, and one to the French National Assembly (note that the latter post is shared with Saint Barthélemy).

Before 2007, Saint Martin was coded as GP (Guadeloupe) in ISO 3166-1. In October 2007, it received the ISO 3166-1 code MF (alpha-2 code), MAF (alpha-3 code), and 663 (numeric code).

There currently exists a movement in Saint Martin aiming for the unification of the island of Saint Martin, which has its own flag.

== Demographics ==
Saint Martin had a population of 31,477 according to the January 2021 census, which means a population density of 592 inhabitants per square kilometre (1,530/sq mi). At the 2017 French census the population was 35,334 (up from only 8,072 inhabitants at the 1982 census). The population decrease between 2017 and 2021 is largely due to the impact of Hurricane Irma which hit the island in early September 2017 and destroyed most of its infrastructure.

Most residents live on the coastal region in the towns of Marigot (the capital), Grand-Case and Quartier-d'Orleans. Most residents are of black or mixed Creole ancestry, with smaller numbers of Europeans and Indians.

French is the official language of the territory. Other languages spoken include English, Dutch, Papiamento and Spanish. The Saint Martin dialect of Virgin Islands Creole (based on English) is spoken in informal situations on both the French and Dutch sides of the island. The sizable Haitian community (7,000 in 2000) also uses Haitian Creole.

Religion in Saint Martin (ARDA 2020 est.)
1. Catholic (91.8%)
2. Protestant (4.56%)
3. Other Christian (0.10%)
4. Baháʼí (0.36%)
5. Muslim (0.21%)
6. Hindu (0.20%)
7. No religion (2.47%)
8. other (0.32%)

Despite the status of French as the official language, English is the predominant language in the collectivity, described by the Prefect as being "essentially anglophone", due to the dominance of English in that part of the Caribbean. In 2025 only 12% of Saint-Martinois students had a sufficient mastery of French when they started high school, a situation which is said to explain the particularly high drop-out rate.

The main religions are Roman Catholicism, Jehovah's Witnesses, various Protestant denominations, Hinduism and Islam.

Historical population
Year	Pop.	±% p.a.
1885	3,400	—
1954	3,366	−0.01%
1961	4,502	+4.08%
1967	5,061	+1.96%
1974	6,191	+2.92%
1982	8,072	+3.65%
1990	28,518	+17.05%
1999	29,078	+0.22%
2006	35,263	+2.87%
2007	35,925	+1.88%
2012	35,742	−0.10%
2017	35,334	−0.23%
2021	31,477	−2.85%
Official figures from French censuses. Census date for censuses after 1999 is 1 January.

=== Structure of the population ===
Population Estimates by Sex and Age Group (01.I.2021) (Provisional):

Age group	Male	Female	Total	%
Total	14 191	16 095	30 286	100
0–4	993	979	1 972	6.51
5–9	1 062	1 075	2 137	7.06
10–14	1 154	1 132	2 286	7.55
15–19	1 152	1 120	2 272	7.50
20–24	876	882	1 758	5.80
25–29	722	857	1 579	5.21
30–34	761	957	1 718	5.67
35–39	766	1 002	1 768	5.84
40–44	785	990	1 775	5.86
45–49	907	1 106	2 013	6.65
50–54	1 006	1 180	2 186	7.22
55–59	1 046	1 159	2 205	7.28
60–64	891	982	1 873	6.18
65–69	732	823	1 555	5.13
70–74	539	641	1 180	3.90
75–79	358	460	818	2.70
80–84	237	351	588	1.94
85–89	133	223	356	1.18
90–94	53	119	172	0.57
95–99	16	44	60	0.20
100+	2	13	15	0.05
Age group	Male	Female	Total	Percent
0–14	3 209	3 186	6 395	21.12
15–64	8 912	10 235	19 147	63.22
65+	2 070	2 674	4 744	15.66

=== Education ===
The collectivity has the following public preschool, primary, and elementary schools:

- Preschools: Jean Anselme, Jérôme Beaupère, Elaine Clarke, Evelina Halley, Ghyslaine Rogers, Trott Simeone
- Primary schools: Omer Arrondell, Émile Choisy, Nina Duverly, Elie Gibs, Aline Hanson, Émile Larmonnie, Marie-Amélie Ledee, Clair Saint-Maximin, Hervé Williams
- École élémentaire M-Antoinette Richard

There are three junior high schools (collège) and one senior high school:

- Junior highs: #1 Mont Des Accords, #2 Soualiga, #3 Quartier d'Orleans
- Lycée Professionnel des Îles Nord (senior high/sixth-form)
- Cité Scolaire Robert Weinum is a joint public junior-senior high school in Saint Martin

=== Religion ===
The majority of the inhabitants of the island of St. Martin profess Christianity, and in the French part the Catholic Church is the faith of the majority. There are also other Christian groups and religions represented on the island.

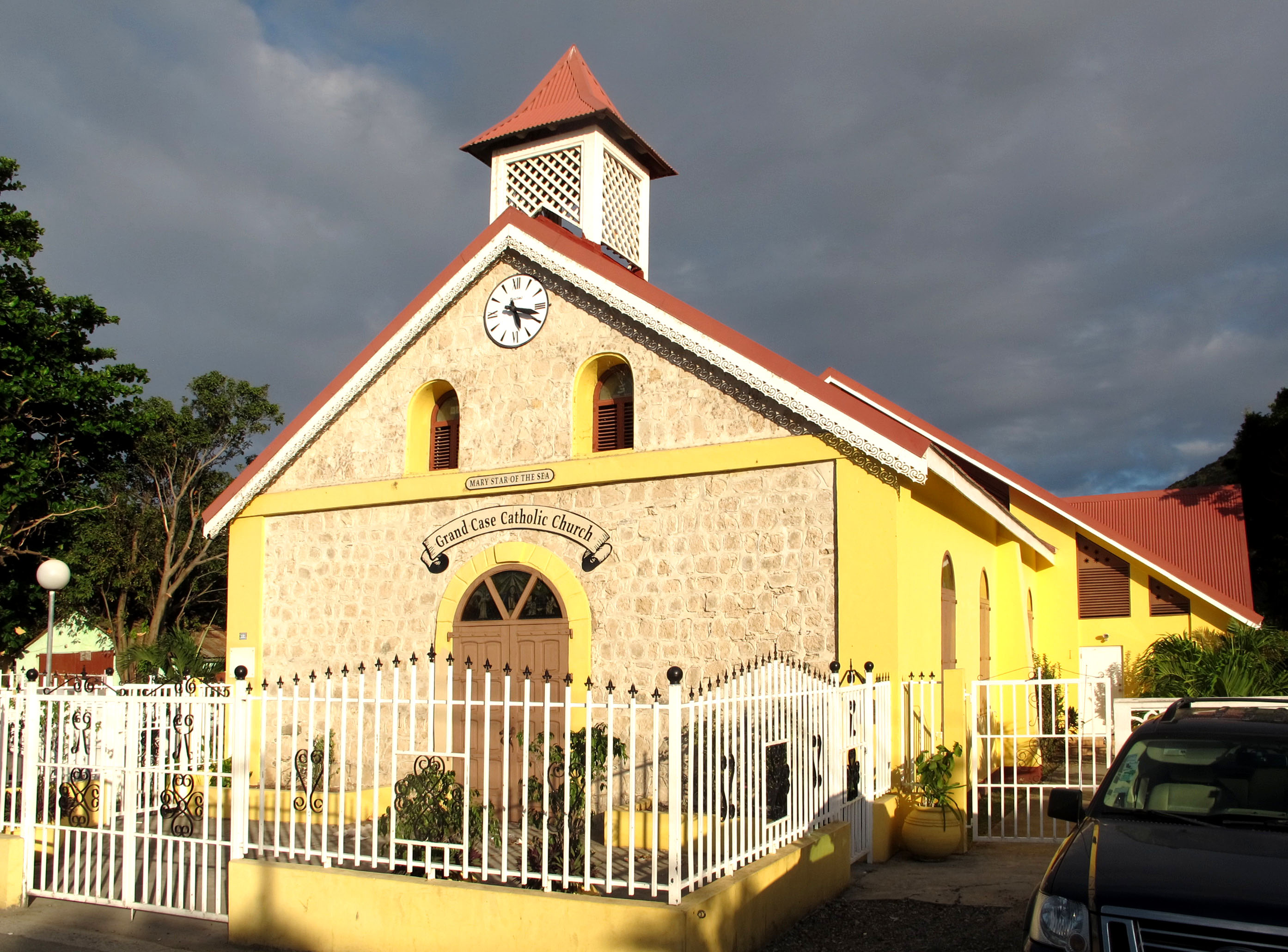
Mary Star of the Sea, a Catholic church in Grand-Case

The French territory of St. Martin is part of the Diocese of Basse-Terre and Pointe-à-Pitre (in Latin, Dioecesis Imae Telluris and in French, Diocèse de Basse-Terre et Pointe-à-Pitre), attached to the organization of the Catholic Church in France. The diocese includes the territories of Guadeloupe, St. Barthélemy and St. Martin. This diocese is part of the ecclesiastical province of Fort-de-France, in the ecclesiastical region of the Antilles, and has as neighbors to the northwest, the diocese of Saint John-Basseterre and to the southeast, the Diocese of Roseau.

About sixty priests are active in the diocese and serve several churches, among them the Church of Saint Martin de Tours (Saint-Martin-de-Tours) in Marigot, the Church of Mary Star of the Sea (Église de Marie Etoile de la Mer) in Grand Case and the Church of Saint Martin in Quartier d'Orléans (Église de Saint-Martin).

The episcopal see is located in Basse-Terre, city of Guadeloupe, with the cathedral of Our Lady of Guadeloupe as the main or mother church, (cathédrale Notre-Dame-de-Guadeloupe).

== Economy ==
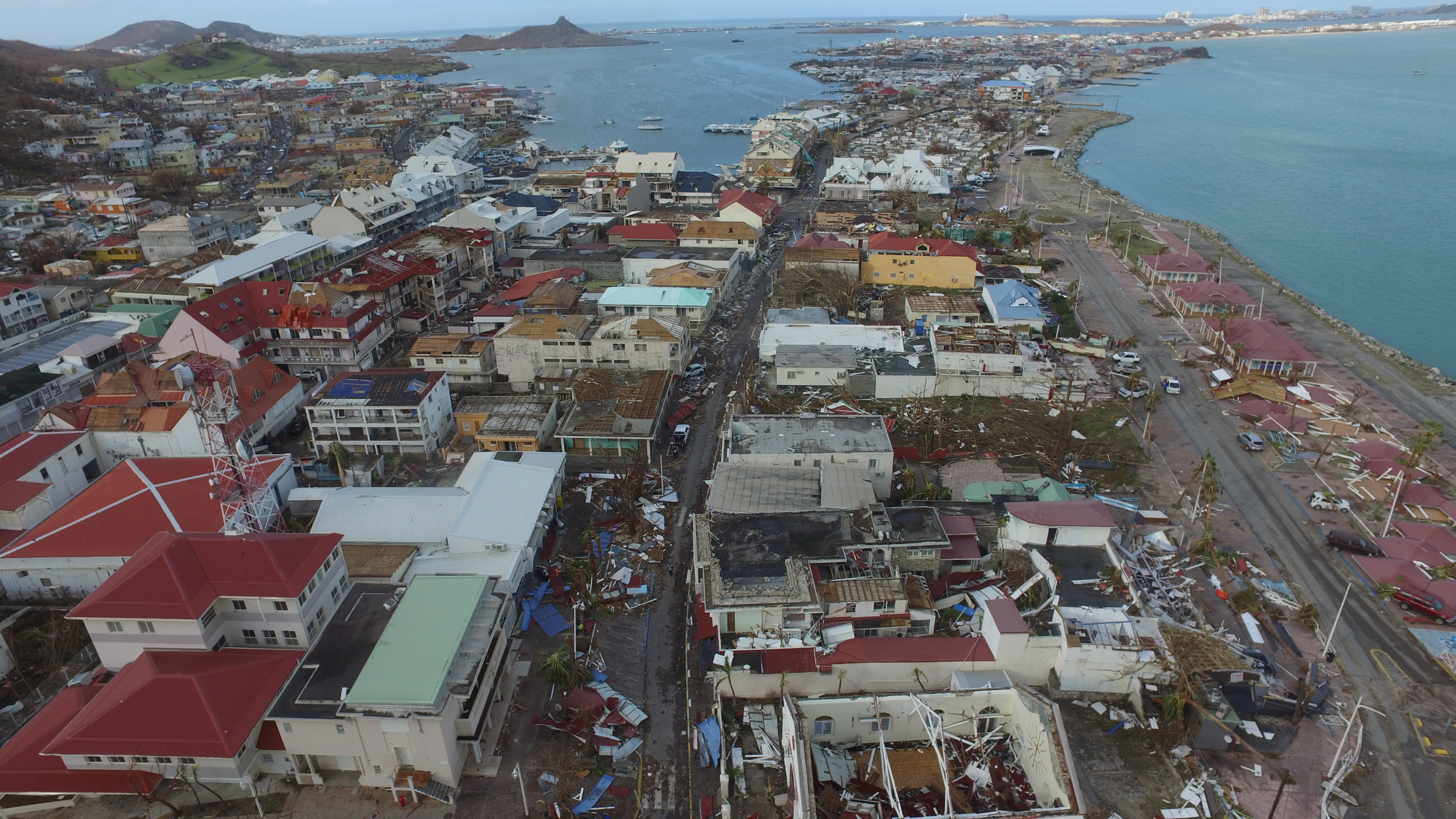
Marigot in 2017 after Hurricane Irma, which severely impacted the tourism-dependent economy

As property of France, the official currency of Saint Martin is the euro, though the US dollar is also widely accepted. Tourism is the main economic activity – with over one million visitors annually some 85% of the population is employed in this sector. The other major sector is the financial services industry. Though limited, agriculture and fishing are also practiced, though these sectors are very small and most food is imported.

INSEE estimated that the nominal GDP of Saint Martin amounted to 581.8 million euros in 2014 (US$771.9 million at 2014 exchanges rates; US$660.3 million at Feb. 2022 exchange rates). In that same year the nominal GDP per capita of Saint Martin was 16,572 euros (US$21,987 at 2014 exchanges rates; US$18,806 at Feb. 2022 exchange rates), which was only half the GDP per capita of metropolitan France in 2014, and 79% of Guadeloupe's GDP per capita. In comparison, the nominal GDP per capita on the Dutch side of the island, Sint Maarten, was US$33,536 in 2014.

== Newspapers ==
The following newspapers are published in Saint Martin:

- Le Pelican
- Faxinfo
- SXMInfo.fr
- Soualiga Post
- St. Martin's Week
- St. Martin News Network (also covers Sint Maarten)

== Transport ==
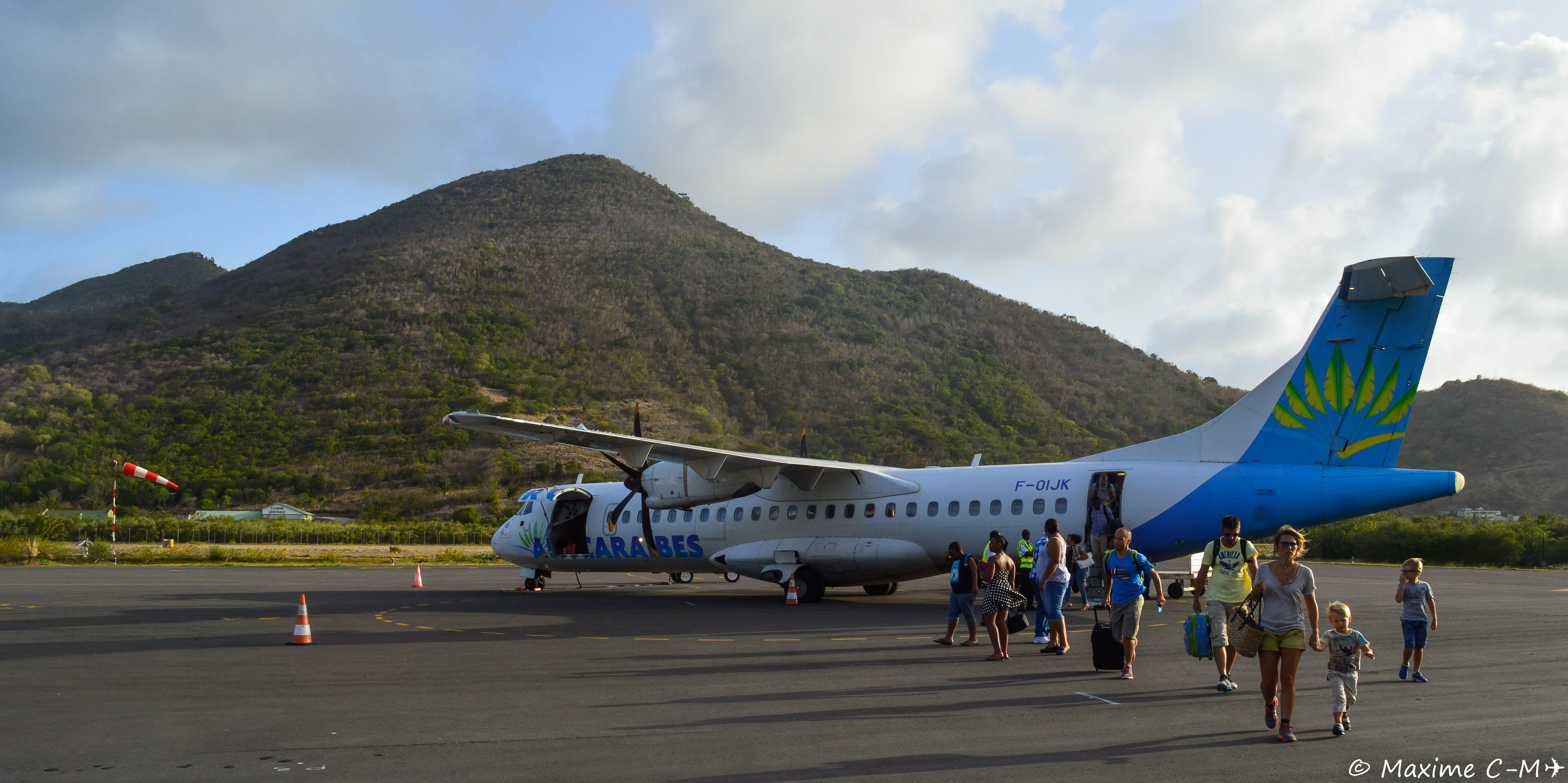
Passengers disembarking at Grand Case-Espérance Airport

Saint Martin has one airport, Grand Case-Espérance Airport, which provides flights to Guadeloupe, Martinique and Saint Barthélemy. For international tourists, Saint Martin relies on Princess Juliana International Airport on the Dutch side of the island.

== Sport ==
Saint Martin has a national football team, and competes in CONCACAF competitions.

== See also ==
- Culture of Saint Martin
- Economy of Saint Martin
- History of Saint Martin
- List of divided islands
