= List of political parties in France =

This article contains a list of political parties in France.

France has a multi-party political system: one in which the number of competing political parties is sufficiently large as to make it almost inevitable that, in order to participate in the exercise of power, any single party must be prepared to negotiate with one or more others with a view to forming electoral alliances and/or coalition agreements.

The dominant French political parties are also characterised by a noticeable degree of intra-party factionalism, making each of them effectively a coalition in itself.

Until 2017, the government of France had alternated between two rather stable coalitions:

- on the centre-left, one led by the Socialist Party and with minor partners such as The Greens and the Radical Party of the Left.
- on the centre-right, one led by The Republicans (and previously its predecessors, the Union for a Popular Movement, Rally for the Republic) and the Union of Democrats and Independents.

This was the case until the 2017 presidential election, when Emmanuel Macron of the centre to centre-right La République En Marche! defeated Marine Le Pen of the far-right National Rally in the second round. This was the first time in which a third party had won the presidency, as well as the first time that neither of the major coalitions had appeared in the second round of a presidential election. This was followed shortly by a significant victory for LREM in the 2017 legislative election, winning a majority of 350 seats. Both the traditional coalitions suffered major defeats.

In the 2022 presidential election, the same scenario repeated, with Emmanuel Macron being again victorious. Both traditional parties (Socialist Party and The Republicans) scored less than 5% each, with Jean-Luc Mélenchon's La France Insoumise emerging as the dominant left-wing party, ranking third in the first round.

The National Rally (previously known as the National Front before a name change in 2018) has also experienced significant successes in other elections. Since 2014, the party has established itself as a major party in France, finishing in first place in the 2014 and 2019 European elections as well as in the 2015 local elections, though the party failed to win government in any regions due to the last-ditch alliance between the centre-left and the centre-right coalitions in Hauts-de-France and Provence-Alpes-Côte d'Azur.

== Elected parties ==
=== Major nationwide represented parties ===
Party	Abbr.	National coalition	Parlimentary group	European affiliation	Leader	Position	Ideology	MPs	Senators	MEPs	Regional councils	Departmental councils
National Rally; Rassemblement national	RN		GRN; UNT	P.eu/PfE	Jordan Bardella	Far-right	French nationalism; Right-wing populism	118 / 577	12 / 348	29 / 81	0 / 18	0 / 98
Renaissance	RE	Ensemble	GRN; RDPI	ALDE/Renew	Gabriel Attal	Centre to centre-right	Liberalism	87 / 577	14 / 348	5 / 81	1 / 18	2 / 98
France Unbowed; La France insoumise	LFI	NFP	LFI-NPF; RASNAG	ELA/GUE/NGL	Manuel Bompard	Left-wing to far-left	Democratic socialism; Left-wing populism	71 / 577	1 / 348	9 / 81	0 / 18	0 / 98
Socialist Party; Parti socialiste	PS	NFP	SOC; SER	PES/S&D	Olivier Faure	Centre-left to left-wing	Social democracy; Pro-Europeanism	65 / 577	63 / 348	10 / 81	5 / 18	27 / 98
The Republicans; Les Républicains	LR	UDC	DR; REP	EPP/EPP group	Bruno Retailleau	Centre-right to right-wing	Conservatism	52 / 577	121 / 348	5 / 81	3 / 18	39 / 98
Democratic Movement; Mouvement démocrate	MoDem	Ensemble	DEM; UC	EDP/Renew	François Bayrou	Centre to centre-right	Christian democracy	36 / 577	4 / 348	2 / 81	0 / 18	1 / 98
Horizons	HOR	Ensemble	HOR; LIRT	Renew	Édouard Philippe	Centre-right	Liberal conservatism	34 / 577	11 / 348	2 / 81	1 / 18	0 / 98
The Ecologists; Les Écologistes	LÉ	NFP	EcoS; GEST	EGP/Greens/EFA	Marine Tondelier	Centre-left to left-wing	Green politics	28 / 577	12 / 348	5 / 81	0 / 18	0 / 98

=== Other nationwide represented parties ===
Party	Abbr.	National coalition	Parlimentary group	Leader or chair	Political position	Ideology	MPs	Senators	MEPs	Regional councils	Departmental councils
Left Party; Parti de gauche	PG	NFP	LFI-NFP	Éric Coquerel; Danielle Simonnet	Left-wing to far-left	Democratic socialism; Left-wing populism; Left-wing nationalism	20 / 577	0 / 348	2 / 81	0 / 18	0 / 98
Union of the Right for the Republic; Union des droites pour la République	UDR	RN	UDR; UNT	Éric Ciotti	Far-right	Conservatism; Right-wing populism	17 / 577	1 / 348	1 / 81	0 / 18	0 / 98
Utiles			LIOT; UC	Bertrand Pancher	Centre	Pro-Europeanism; Humanism; Localism	10 / 577	2 / 348	0 / 81	0 / 18	0 / 98
The Convention; La Convention	LC		SOC; SER	Bernard Cazeneuve	Centre-left	Social democracy; Social-ecology; Progressivism; Pro-Europeanism; Republicanism; Reformism; Secularism	9 / 577	14 / 348	0 / 81	0 / 18	4 / 98
French Communist Party; Parti communiste français	PCF	NFP	GDR; CRCE-K	Fabien Roussel	Left-wing	Communism; Soft Euroscepticism	7 / 577	14 / 348	0 / 81	0 / 18	0 / 98
Union of Democrats and Independents; Union des démocrates et indépendants	UDI	UDC	LIOT; UC	Jean-Christophe Lagarde	Centre to centre-right	Liberalism	7 / 577	36 / 348	1 / 81	0 / 18	8 / 98
Democrats and Progressives; Démocrates et progressistes	DP	Ensemble	EPR; RDPI	Olivier Dussopt	Centre to centre-left	Social liberalism; Social democracy	7 / 577	1 / 348	0 / 81	0 / 18	0 / 98
Génération.s	G.s	NFP; RpG!	EcoS	Benoît Hamon	Centre-left to left-wing	Democratic socialism; Eco-socialism	6 / 577	0 / 348	0 / 81	0 / 18	0 / 98
Act; Agir		Ensemble	EPR; LIRT	Franck Riester	Centre-right to right-wing	Conservative liberalism; Pro-Europeanism	5 / 577	6 / 348	1 / 81	0 / 18	0 / 98
French Future; L'Avenir français	LAF	RN	GRN	Jean-Philippe Tanguy	Right-wing to far-right	Gaullism; National conservatism; Euroscepticism	5 / 577	0 / 348	1 / 81	0 / 18	0 / 98
Let's Be Free; Soyons libres	SL	LR; UDC	DR; REP	Valérie Pécresse	Centre-right	Liberal conservatism; Neo-Gaullism; Economic liberalism; Pro-Europeanism	4 / 577	6 / 348	0 / 81	1 / 18	1 / 98
The Aftermath; L'Après		NFP; RpG!	EcoS		Left-wing	Socialism; Political ecology	4 / 577	0 / 348	0 / 81	0 / 18	0 / 98
Identity–Liberties; Identité–Libertés	IDL	RN	GRN	Laurence Trochu	Far-right	French nationalism; National conservatism; Islamophobia; Anti-immigration; Economic liberalism	3 / 577	0 / 348	4 / 81	0 / 18	0 / 98
Dare France; Oser la France	OLF	LR	DR; REP	Julien Aubert	Right-wing	Gaullism	3 / 577	4 / 348	0 / 81	0 / 18	0 / 98
New Energy; Nouvelle Énergie	NE		DR; REP	David Lisnard	Right-wing	Liberalism; Ordoliberalism; Christian democracy; Economic liberalism; Pompidouism	2 / 577	18 / 348	0 / 81	0 / 18	1 / 98
We France; Nous France	NF	LR	DR; REP	Xavier Bertrand	Right-wing	Conservatism; Liberal conservatism	2 / 577	5 / 348	0 / 81	0 / 18	0 / 98
Public Square; Place publique	PP	NFP	SOC; GEST	Raphaël Glucksmann	Centre-left	Social democracy; Pro-Europeanism	2 / 577	2 / 348	3 / 81	0 / 18	0 / 98
The Centrists; Les Centristes	LC	UDC	LIOT; UC	Hervé Morin	Centre to centre-right	Conservative liberalism; Christian democracy	2 / 577	5 / 348	0 / 81	1 / 18	2 / 98
Rally for the Republic; Rassemblement pour la République	RPR	RN	GRN	Franck Allisio	Right-wing to far-right	Conservatism; Gaullism	2 / 577	0 / 348	1 / 81	0 / 18	0 / 98
Ecosocialist Left; Gauche écosocialiste	GES	LFI; NFP	LFI-NFP		Left-wing	Socialism; Eco-Socialism; Anti-globalisation	2 / 577	0 / 348	0 / 81	0 / 18	0 / 98
Freedom Party; Parti de la Liberté	PL	Ensemble; RE	EPR	Guillaume Kasbarian	Centre	Libertarianism; Liberalism; Mileism	2 / 577	0 / 348	0 / 81	0 / 18	0 / 98
The Builders; Les bâtisseurs	LB	R&PS	NI	Aurélien Pradié	Centre-right		2 / 577	0 / 348	0 / 81	0 / 18	0 / 98
Stand Up! Debout!	D!	NFP; RpG!	EcoS	François Ruffin	Left-wing	Eco-socialism	2 / 577	0 / 348	0 / 81	0 / 18	0 / 98
Radical Party; Parti radical	PR	Ensemble	EPR; RDSE	Laurent Hénart, Sylvia Pinel	Centre	Liberalism; Pro-Europeanism	1 / 577	5 / 348	0 / 81	0 / 18	0 / 98
Centrist Alliance; Alliance centriste	AC		NI; UC	Philippe FolliotJean-Christophe Fromantin	Centre	Centrism; Liberalism	1 / 577	4 / 348	0 / 81	0 / 18	0 / 98
Territories44; Territoires44	T44		EcoS	Collective Leadership	Left-wing	Green politics	1 / 577	1 / 348	0 / 81	0 / 18	0 / 98
In Common; En commun	EC	LC	NI	Cécile Rilhac	Centre-left	Green politics	1 / 577	0 / 348	0 / 81	0 / 18	0 / 98
Ecology Generation; Génération écologie	GE	NFP	EcoS	Delphine Batho	Centre-left	Green politics; Integral ecology; Eco-feminism	1 / 577	0 / 348	0 / 81	0 / 18	0 / 98
Ecological Revolution for the Living; Révolution écologique pour le vivant	REV	LFI; NFP	LFI-NFP	Aymeric Caron	Left-wing	Animal rights; Social democracy	1 / 577	0 / 348	0 / 81	0 / 18	0 / 98
Independent Workers' Party; Parti ouvrier indépendant	POI	LFI; NFP	LFI-NFP		Left-wing	Marxism	1 / 577	0 / 348	0 / 81	0 / 18	0 / 98
Republican and Socialist Left; Gauche républicaine et socialiste	GRS	FGR; NFP	GDR	Emmanuel Maurel; Marie-Noëlle Lienemann	Left-wing	Socialism; Euroscepticism; Economic interventionism	1 / 577	0 / 348	0 / 81	0 / 18	0 / 98
For a Popular and Social Ecology; Pour une écologie populaire et sociale	PEPS	LFI; NFP	LFI-NFP		Left-wing	Anti-capitalism; Social-ecology; Communalism; Democratic confederalism; Ecofeminism	1 / 577	0 / 348	0 / 81	0 / 18	0 / 98
France Arise; Debout la France	DLF		NI	Nicolas Dupont-Aignan	Right-wing to far-right	French nationalism; National conservatism; Gaullism; Republicanism; Social conservatism; Euroscepticism	1 / 577	0 / 348	0 / 74	0 / 18	0 / 98
Radical Party of the Left; Parti radical de gauche	PRG	LC	RDSE	Guillaume Lacroix	Centre-left	Social liberalism; Pro-Europeanism	0 / 577	4 / 348	0 / 81	0 / 18	2 / 98
Democratic European Force; Force européenne démocrate	FED	UDI; UDC	UC	Jean-Christophe Lagarde	Centre-right	Centrism; Social liberalism; Pro-Europeanism; Christian democracy	0 / 577	2 / 348	0 / 81	0 / 18	1 / 98
Progressive Federation	FP	SER	LC	François Rebsamen	Centre-left	Social liberalism Progressivism; Pro-Europeanism	0 / 577	1 / 348	0 / 81	0 / 18	0 / 98
Together in our Territories; Ensemble sur nos territoires	ESNT	T44	GEST	Ronan Dantec	Left-wing	Socialism; Green politics; Breton nationalism	0 / 577	1 / 348	0 / 81	0 / 18	0 / 98
Reconquest; Reconquête	R!			Éric Zemmour	Far-right	Ultraconservatism; National conservatism; Anti-immigration; Gaullism; Euroscepticism	0 / 577	0 / 348	1 / 81	0 / 18	0 / 98

=== Regional parties with national representation ===
Territory	Party	Abbr.	National coalition	Leader or chair	Députés	Senators	MEPs	Presidency of regional councils	Presidency of departmental councils	Political position	Ideology
Basque Country	Euskal Herria Bai	EH Bai	NFP	Nikolas Blain	1 / 3	0 / 348	0 / 79	0 / 1		Left-wing to far-left	Basque independence; Left-wing nationalism; Abertzale left; Socialism; Ecologism
Corsica	Femu a Corsica	Femu	LT	Gilles Simeoni	1 / 4	1 / 2	0 / 79	1 / 1		Centre	Corsican nationalism Corsican autonomism
Corsica	Party of the Corsican Nation	PNC	LT	Jean-Christophe Angelini	1 / 4	0 / 2	0 / 79	0 / 1		Left-wing	Corsican nationalism Left-wing nationalism Social democracy
Corsica	Bonapartist Central Committee	CCB	Horizons	André Villanova	1 / 4	0 / 2	0 / 79	0 / 1		Centre-right	Ajaccio Localism; Corsican Regionalism; Bonapartism; Conservatism; Constitutional monarchism
French Polynesia	Tāpura Huiraʻatira	TH	Ensemble	Édouard Fritch	1 / 3	2 / 2	0 / 79	0 / 1		Centre-right	Liberalism; Autonomism; Anti-independence
French Polynesia	Tāvini Huiraʻatira	TH	GDR	Oscar Temaru	1 / 3	0 / 2	0 / 79	0 / 1		Left-wing	French Polynesian independence Social democracy Democratic socialism Progressivism
French Polynesia	A here ia Porinetia	AHIP	LIOT	Nicole Sanquer	1 / 3	0 / 2	0 / 79	0 / 1		Right-wing to far-right	French Polynesian autonomism Anti-independence; French republicanism Local reformism
French Guiana	Guiana Rally	GR	Ensemble	Rodolphe Alexandre	0 / 2	2 / 2	0 / 79	0 / 1		Centre	Liberalism; Pro-Europeanism
French Guiana	Decolonization and Social Emancipation Movement	MDES	NFP	Fabien Canavy	1 / 2	0 / 2	0 / 79	0 / 1		Far-left	Guianese nationalism Anti-colonialism; Marxism
French Guiana	ASEWA		NFP	Davy Rimane	1 / 2	0 / 2	0 / 79	0 / 1		Left-wing	Localism; Guianese nationalism
(France) French diaspora	Solidary Alliance of French People Abroad	ASFE	LR	Évelyne Renaud-Garabedian	0 / 11	3 / 6	0 / 79	0 / 1		Big tent	
Guadeloupe	United Guadeloupe, Solidary and Responsible	GUSR	Ensemble	Guy Losbar	0 / 4	2 / 3	0 / 79	1 / 1		Centre-left	Social democracy; Social liberalism; Autonomism
Guadeloupe	Progressive Democratic Party of Guadeloupe	PPDG	NFP	Jacques Bangou	1 / 4	0 / 2	0 / 79	0 / 1		Centre-left to left-wing	Democratic socialism; Post-Marxism; Guadeloupean autonomy
Guadeloupe	Guadeloupean Federation of the Socialist Party	FGPS	NFP	Olivier Nicolas	1 / 4	1 / 3	0 / 79	0 / 1	0 / 1	Centre-Left	Democratic socialism Progressivism; Social democracy Social-ecology pro-Europeanism
Guadeloupe	Eko Zabym	EZ	LIOT, Utiles	Olivier Serva	1 / 4	0 / 2	0 / 79	0 / 1			Localism
Martinique	Péyi-A		GDR, NFP	Jean-Philippe Nilor, Marcelin Nadeau	3 / 4	0 / 2	0 / 79	0 / 1		Left-wing	Post-Marxism; Separatism
Martinique	Socialist Federation of Martinique	FSM	SOC, NFP	Béatrice Bellay	1 / 4	0 / 2	0 / 79	0 / 1		Left-wing	Social Democracy
Martinique	La Martinique Ensemble	LME	SOC, NFP	Catherine Conconne	0 / 4	1 / 2	0 / 79	0 / 1		Left-wing	Localism
Martinique	Dynamique Trinitéenne	DT	SOC, NFP	Frederic Buval	0 / 4	1 / 2	0 / 79	0 / 1		Left-wing	Localism
Martinique	Martinican Progressive Party	PPM	NFP	Serge Letchimy	0 / 4	0 / 2	0 / 79	1 / 1		Left-wing	Progressivism; Democratic socialism Autonomism
New Caledonia	The Rally		LR	Thierry Santa	0 / 2	1 / 2	0 / 79	0 / 1		Right-wing	Anti-separatism; Gaullism; Conservatism; Liberal conservatism Christian democracy
New Caledonia	Caledonian Union	UC	GDR, Ensemble	Daniel Goa	1 / 2	1 / 2	0 / 79	0 / 1		Centre-left	Separatism; Melanesian socialism Christian left
New Caledonia	Générations NC	GNC	Ensemble	Nicolas Metzdorf	1 / 2	0 / 2	0 / 79	0 / 1		Centre to centre-right	Anti-separatism; Autonomism; Conservative liberalism Centralism; Ecologism
Réunion	For Réunion	PLR	NFP	Huguette Bello	2 / 7	1 / 4	0 / 79	0 / 1		Left-wing	Post-Marxism; Democratic socialism Regionalism
Réunion	Rézistans Égalité 974	RÉ974	LFI, NFP	Jean-Hugues Ratenon	2 / 7	0 / 4	0 / 79	0 / 1		Left-wing	Democratic Socialism; Regionalism
Réunion	Le Progrès	LP	NFP		1 / 7	0 / 4	0 / 79	0 / 1		Left-wing	Social democracy
Seine-Saint-Denis	Seine-Saint-Denis at Heart!	SSDAC	LFI, NFP	Aly Diouara	1 / 12	0 / 6	0 / 79	0 / 1		Left-wing	Localism
Saint Martin	Union for Democracy	UD	LR	Daniel Gibbs	0 / 1	1 / 1	0 / 79	0 / 1		Right-wing	
Saint Martin	Saint-Martinois Rally	RSM	LR	Louis Mussington	1 / 1	0 / 1	0 / 79	1 / 1		Centre-right	Autonomism
Saint Pierre and Miquelon	Cap sur l'avenir		Ensemble	Annick Girardin	0 / 1	1 / 1	0 / 79	0 / 1		Centre-left	Classical radicalism Social liberalism
Saint Pierre and Miquelon	Archipelago Tomorrow	AD	RDSE	Gérard Grignon	1 / 1	0 / 1	0 / 79	1 / 1		Centre-right	Liberal conservatism Economic liberalism

=== Region-only parties ===
==== Represented in Metropolitan France ====
Acronym and Name	National coalition	Leader or Chairman	Regional councillors	Departmental councillors	Ideology
CNIP: National Centre of Independents and Peasants		Bruno North	4 / 1,926	2 / 4,046	French nationalism Conservatism; Agrarianism; Euroscepticism
UBD: Breton Democratic Union	R&PS; New Popular Front	Lydie Massard; Pierre-Emmanuel Marais	4 / 1,926	1 / 4,046	Autonomism; Environmentalism; Pro-Europeanism
OÉ: Occitanie Écologie		José Bové	4 / 1,926	0 / 4,046	Green politics
Cap21		Corinne Lepage	3 / 1,926	2 / 4,046	Environmentalism; Green liberalism Green politics
LMR: Rurality Movement		Eddie Puyjalon	3 / 1,926	1 / 4,046	Agrarianism Conservatism; Euroscepticism; Alter-globalism
MRC: Citizen and Republican Movement	CNR 2027	Thierry Cotelle	2 / 1,880	2 / 4,046	Democratic socialism, Soft Euroscepticism; Social Gaullism
VIA: VIA, the Way of the People	Reconquête	Jean-Frédéric Poisson	2 / 1,926	2 / 4,046	Christian democracy Social conservatism Christian right Soft Euroscepticism
UCE: Union of Centrists and Ecologists		Antonin Duarte	2 / 1,926	1 / 4,046	Green politics Social Democracy; Centrism
MEI: Independent Ecological Movement		Antoine Waechter	2 / 1,926	0 / 4,046	Green politics Centrism; Anti-nuclear
ÉAC: Ecology at the Centre		Jean-Marc Governatori	2 / 1,926	0 / 4,046	Green politics
LL: The Localists	RN	Hervé Juvin	2 / 1,926	0 / 4,046	Identarianism; Anti-globalisation; Green conservatism
LFH: Humanist France		Benoît Jimenez	1 / 1,926	6 / 4,046	Gaullism; Social Gaullism; Neo-Gaullism; Humanism; Republicanism; Social liberalism Liberal conservatism
BWR: For Brittany!		André Lavanant	1 / 1,926	3 / 4,046	Breton nationalism Regionalism; Socialism; Ecology
LVP: The Popular Greens	LFI	Collective leadership	1 / 1,926	2 / 4,046	Eco-socialism
MDA: Marseille First		Stéphane Ravier	1 / 1,926	1 / 4,046	Regionalism; Identitarianism
PA: Animalist Party		Antoine Stathoulias; Douchka Markovic; Hélène Thouy; Pierre Mazaheri	1 / 1,880	0 / 4,046	Animal welfare Animal rights
BE: Brittany Ecology		N/A	1 / 1,926	0 / 4,046	Progressivism; Green politics, European federalism Alter-globalization; Regionalism
LES: Les Écolos Solidaires		N/A	1 / 1,926	0 / 4,046	Green politics Localism
IC: Ideal Citizens	LR	Aurélie Gros	1 / 1,926	0 / 4,046	Direct democracy
ÉP: Écologie Positive		Yann Wehrling	1 / 1,926	0 / 4,046	Green politics Pro-Europeanism
VET: Vienne in Transition		Collective leadership	0 / 1,926	4 / 4,046	Localism; Socialism; Political Ecology
ND: New Deal	NFP	Felix David-Riviere; Aline Mouquet	0 / 1,926	2 / 4,046	Progressivism; Keynesianism; European federalism
ADS: Alternative Democracy Socialism		Pierre Allard	0 / 1,926	2 / 4,046	Socialism; Progressivism
MDC: Citizens Movement	The Convention	Jean-Marie Alexandre	0 / 1,880	2 / 4,046	Republicanism; Democratic socialism
LRDG: The Radicals of the Left	Federation of the Republican Left	Stéphane Saint-André; Isabelle Amaglio-Térisse	0 / 1,926	2 / 4,046	Solidarism; Green politics Pro-Europeanism; Secularism; Progressivism
LS: League of the South		Jacques Bompard	0 / 1,926	2 / 4,046	National conservatism, Identitarian, Anti-globalization; Regionalism; Patriotism; Localism; Poujadism; Liberal conservatism
TEM: Territories in Movement		Jean-Christophe Fromantin	0 / 1,926	1 / 4,046	Liberalism
LFRS: A Republican and United France	CNR 2027	Vincent Guibert	0 / 1,926	1 / 4,046	Social democracy; Secularism; Soft Euroscepticism
MAT: Marseille Avant Tout		Samia Ghali	0 / 1,926	1 / 4,046	Localism; Green Politics; Left-wing politics
GC: Citizens' Left			0 / 1,926	1 / 4,046	Socialism; Progressivism; Localism

==== Represented in Corsica ====
Acronym and Name	National coalition	Leader or Chairman	Corsican Assembly councillors	Ideology
Rinnovu		Paul-Félix Benedetti	6 / 63	Corsican nationalism Corsican independence Socialism; Humanism
CL: Corsica Libera		Jean-Guy Talamoni	1 / 63	Corsican independence Separatism; Left-wing nationalism

==== Represented in Guadeloupe ====
Acronym and Name	National coalition	Leader or Chairman	Regional Council of Guadeloupe	Departmental Council of Guadeloupe	Ideology
FRAPP: Abymian Gathering Force for Progress		Éric Jalton	0 / 41	4 / 42	Localism; Left-wing politics

Others:

- Guadeloupe Communist Party (Parti Communiste Guadeloupéen, PCG)
- People's Union for the Liberation of Guadeloupe (Union Populaire pour la Libération de la Guadeloupe, UPLG)
- Guadeloupean Objective (Objectif Guadeloupéen)

==== Represented in French Guiana ====
Acronym and Name	National coalition	Leader or Chairman	Assembly of French Guiana	Ideology
Péyi G: Péyi Guyane	New Popular Front	Gabriel Serville	7 / 55	Guianese regionalism Progressivism; Environmentalism
AGEG: On the left in French Guiana		Albéric Benth	1 / 55	Guianese Autonomism
PSG: Guianese Socialist Party		Patrice Catayée	1 / 55	Democratic socialism Social democracy Guianese Autonomism

Others:

Party	Abbr.	Ideology	Founded
Democratic Forces of Guiana; Forces démocratiques de Guyane	FDG	Social democracy, autonomism	1992
Walwari		Socialism, autonomism	1992

==== Represented in Martinique ====
Acronym and Name	National coalition	Leader or Chairman	Assembly of Martinique	Ideology
MIM: Martinican Independence Movement	New Popular Front	Alfred Marie-Jeanne	5 / 51	Martinican nationalism Decolonization
BPM: Build the Martinique Country		David Zobda	3 / 51	Post-Marxism; Autonomism
MPF: Franciscan Popular Movement		Maurice Antiste	2 / 51	Autonomism
VAS: Living in Schœlcher		Félix Catherine	2 / 51	Localism
PALIMA: Party for the Liberation of Martinique		Francis Carole	1 / 51	Separatism
RDM: Martinican Democratic Rally		Claude Lise	1 / 51	Martinican autonomism Social democracy
MÉ: Martinique Ecology		Louis Boutrin	1 / 51	Environmentalism
RFL: Gathering of the Forces of Lorrine		Justin Pamphile	1 / 51	Localism

==== Represented in Mayotte ====
Acronym and Name	National coalition	Leader or Chairman	Departmental Council of Mayotte	Ideology
MDM: Movement for the Development of Mayotte		Daniel Zaïdani	7 / 51	anti-Separatism; Départementalism
MRGS: Movement for the Renewal of the Great South		Salime Mdéré	2 / 51	Centrism

Others:

- Force of the Rally and the Alliance for Democracy (Force de Rassemblement et d'Alliance pour le Progrès)

==== Represented in New Caledonia ====
Acronym and Name	National coalition	Leader or Chairman	Congress of New Caledonia	Ideology
PALIKA: Party of Kanak Liberation	UNI	Jean-Pierre Djaïwé; Charles Washetine	10 / 54	Separatism; Scientific socialism Anti-imperialism; Left-wing nationalism
LCR: Caledonian Republicans	Les Loyalistes	Sonia Backès	8 / 54	Anti-separatism; Economic liberalism Republicanism
EO: Oceanian Awakening		Milakulo Tukumuli	3 / 54	Wallisian politics Minority interests Liberalism; Centrism; Multiracialism; Regionalism; Environmentalism
MPC: Caledonian People's Movement	Les Loyalistes	Gil Brial	2 / 54	Anti-separatism; Conservatism; Liberal conservatism Federalism
MRC: Caledonian Republican Movement	Les Loyalistes	Philippe Blaise	1 / 54	Anti-separatism; Conservative liberalism Localism
UPM: Melanesian Progressive Union	UNI	Victor Tutugoro	1 / 54	Separatism; Social democracy
DUS: Unitary Dynamik South	FLNKS	Sylvain Pabouty	1 / 54	Kanak nationalism Scientific socialism Localism
LKS: Kanak Socialist Liberation	FLNKS	Basile Citré	1 / 54	Separatism; Melanesian socialism Democratic socialism
PT: Labour Party	FLNKS	Marie-Pierre Goyetche	1 / 54	Separatism; Revolutionary socialism Alter-globalism; Anti-colonialism; Anti-capitalism; Eco-socialism; Anti-imperialism; Left-wing nationalism
RDO: Oceanian Democratic Rally	FLNKS	Aloïsio Sako	1 / 54	Separatism; Melanesian socialism Communitarianism

==== Represented in French Polynesia ====
Acronym and Name	National coalition	Leader or Chairman	Assembly of French Polynesia	Ideology
AFT: A Fano Ti'a	None	Moetai Brotherson	15 / 54	French Polynesian independence Political ecology
ʻĀmuitahiraʻa o te Nūnaʻa Māʻohi	UDI	Bruno Sandras	1 / 54	Conservatism; French Polynesian autonomy

==== Represented in Reunion ====
Acronym and Name	National coalition	Leader or Chairman	Regional Council of Réunion	Departmental Council of Réunion	Ideology
PCR: Communist Party of Réunion	New Popular Front	Élie Hoarau	3 / 45	4 / 50	Communism; Post-Marxism; Regionalism
Banian		Patrice Selly	2 / 45	2 / 50	Localism
OF: Objectif Réunion		Didier Robert	2 / 45	0 / 50	Right-wing politics
ER: Endemik Réunion		Collective leadership	1 / 45	0 / 50	Localism; Direct democracy
FRA: France Réunion Avenir		Jacquet Hoarau	1 / 45	0 / 50	Right-wing politics
APR: Popular Action of Réunion		Claude Hoarau	1 / 45	0 / 50	Left-wing politics
MPTU: Trait d'Union Political Movement	Renaissance	Michel Vergoz	1 / 45	0 / 50	Centrism
CREA: Citizens of Reunion Island in Action		Vanessa Miranville	0 / 45	2 / 50	Localism; Environmentalism

Others:

- For Réunion (Pour La Réunion)
- Le Progrès

==== Represented in Saint Martin ====
Acronym and Name	National coalition	Leader or Chairman	Territorial Council of Saint-Martin	Ideology
UD: Union for Democracy		Daniel Gibbs	5 / 23	Right-wing politics
GH: Generation Hope		Jules Charville	2 / 23	Centrism; Participatory democracy

Others:

- Union for Progress/UMP (Union pour le Progrès, Louis Constant-Fleming)
- Rally Responsibility Success (Rassemblement responsabilité réussite, Alain Richardson)
- Succeed Saint Martin (Réussir Saint-Martin, Jean-Luc Hamlet)
- Alliance (Alliance, Dominique Riboud)
- Democratic Alliance for Saint Martin (Alliance démocratique pour Saint-Martin, Wendel Cocks)
- Saint Martin Rally (Rassemblement Saint-Martinois, Louis Mussington)

==== Represented in Saint Barthélemy ====
Acronym and Name	National coalition	Leader or Chairman	Territorial Council of Saint Barthélemy	Ideology
SBAE: Saint-Barth Action-Équilibre		Romaric Magras	8 / 19	
SBA: St. Barths First	The Republicans	Romaric Magras	6 / 19	Liberal conservatism
UPSB: All United for Saint Barthélemy		Xavier Lédée	5 / 19	Centre-right politics

==== Represented in Saint Pierre and Miquelon ====
- Saint Pierre and Miquelon Together (French name is Ensemble pour construire, related to Socialist Party; also known as Together to build)

== Non-elected parties ==
Acronym and Name	National coalition	Leader or Chairman	Political position
UPR: Popular Republican Union		François Asselineau	French nationalism Hard Euroscepticism
RS: Sovereign Republic		Georges Kuzmanovic	Hard Euroscepticism
PDF: Party of France		Thomas Joly	Identitarianism; Ultranationalism; Social conservatism
LP: The Patriots		Florian Philippot	French nationalism Hard Euroscepticism; Right-wing populism Traditional Gaullism; Conspiracism; Anti-vaccination
CJ: Comités Jeanne		Jean-Marie Le Pen	Ultranationalism; Euroscepticism; Social conservatism Anti-globalization; Right-wing populism
SIEL: Sovereignty, Identity and Freedoms		Karim Ouchikh	Identitarianism; Euroscepticism; Economic liberalism
MNR: National Republican Movement		Hubert Savon	French nationalism National conservatism Social conservatism Anti-immigration; Right-wing populism Nouvelle Droite
AR: Royal Alliance		Pierre Bernard	Monarchism; Reactionism; Euroscepticism
NAR: New Royalist Action		Bertrand Renouvin	Royalism; Orléanism; Gaullism
RD: Democratic Rally		Philippe Cartellier	Monarchism; Conservatism; Gaullism; Capetism
LN: The Nationalists		Yvan Benedetti	French nationalism Ultranationalism; Neo-Nazism; Antisemitism; Neo-Pétainism; Neo-fascism; Identitarianism; Anti-immigration
SP: Solidarity and Progress		Jacques Cheminade	Euroscepticism; LaRouchism; Productivism; Conspiracism; Climate change denial
PL: Libertarian Party		Guilhem d'Urbal	Libertarianism
R!: Résistons!	Rural Alliance	Jean Lassalle	Ruralism; Humanism; Protectionism; Agrarianism; Soft Euroscepticism
Le Trèfle: Le Trèfle - The new ecologists	La France Naturel	Joël-Pierre Chevreux	Environmental policy Animal rights
UL: Unser Land	R&PS	Jean-Georges Trouillet	Autonomism; Federalism; Christian democracy
PB: Breton Party	FUEN	Mathieu Guihard	Autonomism; Pro-Europeanism; Breton nationalism
UDMF: Union of French Muslim Democrats		Farid Omeir	French Muslim interests Anti-Zionism
RR: Republican Refoundation	Ensemble	Jean-Pierre Chevènement	Social Gaullism; Republicanism
ADES: Democracy Ecology Solidarity Association	New Popular Front	N/A	Political ecology
Volt: Volt France		Cécile Richard, Adrien Copros	European federalism Social liberalism, Progressivism; Pro-Europeanism
É: Équinoxe		Alexia de Montgolfier	Green politics Pro-nuclear movement
MDP: Movement of Progressives	New Popular Front	François Béchieau	Socialism; Progressivism; Democratic Socialism; Political ecology Reformism
PP: Pirate Party	New Popular Front	Collective leadership	Cyberdemocracy; Political ecology Libertarianism; Pirate politics
ANAP: The Future Does Not Wait		Juliette Méadel	Green politics Participatory democracy Social liberalism
AE: Allons Enfants	New Popular Front	Jonathan Salomon	Social liberalism Participatory democracy
POC: Occitan Party	New Popular Front, R&PS	David Grosclaude	Occitan regionalism Environmentalism; Pro-Europeanism; Federalism
War-Sav: War-Sav – Breton Independence Left		Gaël Roblin	Breton nationalism Anti-capitalism; Democratic socialism Republicanism
IDG: Left Democratic Initiative		Roland Renard	Democratic socialism Communism; Progressivism; Social democracy Reformism
NPA-A: New Anticapitalist Party - l'Anticapitaliste	New Popular Front	Olivier Besancenot	Anti-capitalism; Anti-imperialism; Marxism; Ecosocialism
PT: Workers' Party		Collective leadership	Communism; Trotskyism; Lambertism; Internationalism; Euroscepticism
RP: Révolution Permanente		Anasse Kazib; Ariane Anemoyannis; Elsa Marcel; Adrien Cornet	Marxism; Communism; Trotskyism; Anti-racism; Socialist feminism Anti-imperialism; Anti-fascism; Internationalism
NPA-R: New Anticapitalist Party - Révolutionnaires		Collective leadership	Anti-capitalism; Revolutionary socialism Anti-imperialism; Marxism; Ecosocialism
PPLD: Party for Degrowth		Stéphane Madelaine	Degrowth; Political ecology Anti-capitalism
PCRF: Communist Revolutionary Party of France		Pierre Komorov	Communism; Marxism-Leninism
PRC: Communist Revolutionary Party		Antonio Sanchez	Communism; Marxism-Leninism; Revolutionary socialism Anti-imperialism
PCOF: Workers' Communist Party of France		Collective leadership	Communism; Marxism–Leninism; Hoxhaism; Anti-revisionism
URC: Union for Communist Reconstruction		Charles Hoareau; William Roger	Communism; Marxism–Leninism; Anti-imperialism; Antifascism
PRCF: Pole of Communist Revival in France		Fadi Kassem	Communism; Marxism–Leninism; Left-wing nationalism
OCML–VP: Marxist–Leninist Communist Organization – Proletarian Way		?	Communism; Marxism–Leninism; Maoism; Antifascism
LO: Lutte Ouvrière		Nathalie Arthaud	Trotskyism; Internationalism; Feminism

== Historical parties ==
=== French Revolution ===
- Jacobin Club (Centre-left to left-wing)
  - Girondist (Centre-left)*For the time
  - Maraisards (Syncretic)
  - Montagnards (Radicalism)
  - Thermidorians (Centre)
- Cordeliers Club (Left-wing to far-left)
  - Hébertistes (Far-left)
- Feuillants Club
- Enragés (Far-left)
- Monarchiens (Centre to centre-right)
- Club de Clichy (Right-wing)
- Bonapartists (1815)

=== 19th Century ===
- Bonapartists
- Progressive Republicans

=== 20th Century ===
- Democratic Republican Alliance
- Socialist Party of France (1902)
- French Socialist Party (1902)
- French Section of the Workers' International
- French Socialist Party (1919)
- Popular Democratic Party
- Popular Republican Union of Gironde
- French Agrarian and Farmer Party
- Socialist Party of France – Jean Jaurès Union
- Radical-Socialist Party Camille Pelletan
- Republican, Social and Agrarian Party
- National Popular Rally
- Farmers' Party for Social Union
- Republican Party of Liberty
- Democratic and Socialist Union of the Resistance
- Centre républicain
- Union of the Democratic Forces
- Unified Socialist Party
- European Liberal Party
- Federation of the Democratic and Socialist Left
- Revolutionary Communist League
- Democratic Force (France)
- Rally for the Republic
- Liberal Democracy
- Les Mauves

=== 21st Century ===
- Federation for a Social and Ecological Alternative
- Europe Ecology
- The Greens (France)
- Union for a Popular Movement
- Les Alternatifs
- Solidary Republic
- Unitary Left
- The New Democrats

== Political parties in French overseas possessions ==
- List of political parties in French Guiana
- List of political parties in French Polynesia
- List of political parties in Guadeloupe
- List of political parties in Martinique
- List of political parties in Mayotte
- List of political parties in New Caledonia
- List of political parties in Reunion
- List of political parties in Saint Barthélemy
- List of political parties in the Collectivity of Saint Martin
- List of political parties in Saint-Pierre and Miquelon
- List of political parties in Wallis and Futuna

=== Historical parties ===
- French India Socialist Party
- Mahé Socialist Party

== See also ==
- Liberalism and radicalism in France
- Lists of political parties
