= Annick Petrus =

French politician

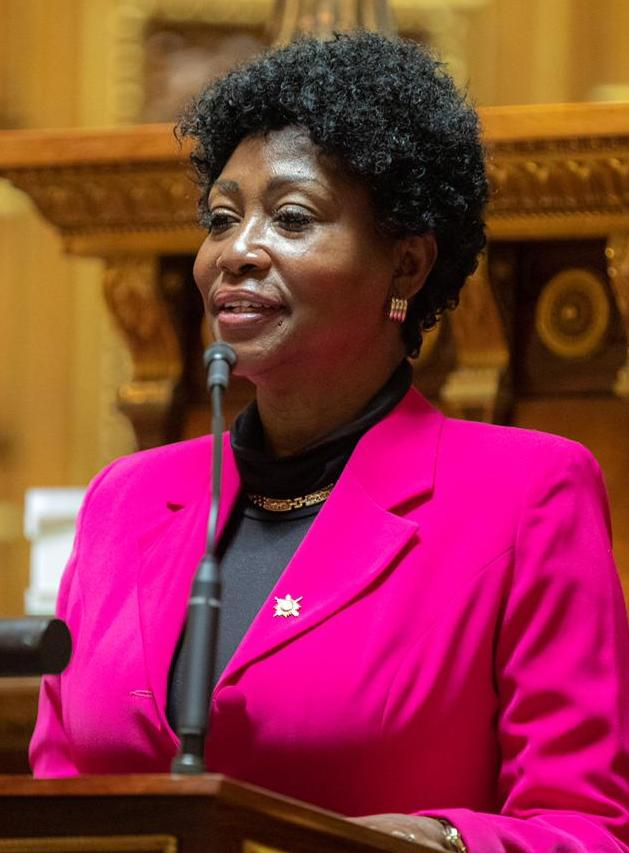

Member of the French Senate for Saint Martin
- Incumbent
- Assumed office 1 October 2020
- Preceded by: Guillaume Arnell

Member of the Territorial Council of Saint Martin
- Incumbent
- Assumed office 2 April 2017

Personal details
- Born: 5 January 1961 (age 65) Pointe-à-Pitre, Guadeloupe
- Party: MAP (before 2012); Union for Democracy (since 2012); LR (since 2020); RSM (since 2021)
- Education: University of the French West Indies and Guiana

Annick Danièle Petrus (born 5 January 1961) is a French Saint Martinois educator and politician. She has served as the Senator for the Collectivity of Saint Martin since October 2020 as a member of the Union for Democracy and The Republicans (LR) parties. Petrus is the first woman to represent Saint Martin's lone seat in the French Senate. Additionally, she has served in the Territorial Council of Saint Martin since 2017.

== Biography ==
Petrus was born on 5 January 1961 in Guadeloupe to a Saint Martinois mother and a Guadeloupean father. She is a native of Guadeloupe, but divided her time between that island and Saint Martin as a child. She received a master's degree in educational sciences from the University of the French West Indies and Guiana. Petrus has two children, a son and a daughter.

In 1990, Petrus permanently moved to Saint Martin to work as a teacher. She later became principal of Emile Larmonie primary school in Cul-de-Sac, Saint Martin. Petrus has served as a volunteer firefighter in the mid-2000s, after accompanying her son to his firefighting training in Guadeloupe.

Petrus first ran for political office in the 2012 Saint Martin Territorial Council election, but her political group was largely defeated in the election. Shortly after her loss, Petrus joined the Union for Democracy (UD) party, led by Daniel Gibbs.

Annick Petrus was elected to the Territorial Council of Saint Martin on the Union for Democracy ticket in the 2017 general election. She was appointed as the council's third vice president shortly after taking office.

In the 2020 French Senate election, Petrus was nominated for the Senator of Saint Martin seat in the French Senator by the majority UD party. Her opponents included incumbent Senator Guillaume Arnell of the RDSE group, who was seeking a second term. The island's lone national senator is selected through an indirect election by the Grand Electors of Saint Martin, largely made up of members of the Territorial Council. Petrus failed to secure a majority in the first round on 27 September 2020, receiving only 10 votes, but won the second round with 68.2%. Petrus won 15 votes in the second round, versus five votes for Marthe Ogoundele-Tessi, and two for outgoing Senator Guillaume Arnell.

Petrus took office on 1 October 2020, becoming the first woman to represent Saint Martin in the French Senate. She sits within the LR parliamentary group.
