= List of senators of the Collectivity of Saint Martin =

Location of Saint Martin in France

Following is a list of senators of Saint Martin, people who have represented the collectivity of Saint Martin in the Senate of France. The lone senate seat representing Saint Martin was created in 2008. The senator serves a six-year term.

== Election process ==
The Senator from Saint Martin is elected by an electoral college consisting of the members of the Territorial Council of Saint Martin and the deputy of the French National Assembly representing Saint Barthélemy and Saint-Martin's 1st constituency. If no candidate receives a majority, a second round is held to determine the winner.

== Fifth Republic ==
Senators for Saint Martin under the French Fifth Republic were:

Name	In office	Left office	Group	Notes
Louis-Constant Fleming	1 October 2008	31 December 2013	Union for a Popular Movement (UMP)	resigned
Office vacant	1 January 2014	30 September 2014	-	Office remained vacant for nine months following Senator Fleming's resignation
Guillaume Arnell	1 October 2014	30 September 2020	European Democratic and Social Rally group	
Annick Petrus	1 October 2020		The Republicans (LR)	Pertus is the first woman to represent Saint Martin the French Senate. She has also served in the Territorial Council of Saint Martin since 2017.

== Sources ==
- Liste des anciens sénateurs de la Vème République par circonscription (in French), Sénat de France
- Liste par département - Saint Martin (in French), Sénat de France
