= Results of the 2024 French legislative election in Saint-Martin et Saint-Barthélémy =

Following the first round of the 2024 French legislative election on 30 June 2024, runoff elections in each constituency where no candidate received a vote share greater than 50 percent were scheduled for 7 July. Candidates permitted to stand in the runoff elections needed to either come in first or second place in the first round or achieve more than 12.5 percent of the votes of the entire electorate (as opposed to 12.5 percent of the vote share due to low turnout).

== Saint-Martin and Saint-Barthélémy ==
=== Sole constituency ===
Candidate	Party or alliance		First round		Second round	
Candidate	Party or alliance		Votes	%	Votes	%
Frantz Gumbs	Ensemble	Saint-Martinois Rally	2,867	41.44	3,942	56.02
Alexandra Questel	Miscellaneous right	Independent	1,378	19.92	3,095	43.98
Philippe Philidor	Miscellaneous right	Independent	1,170	16.91		
Clément Chapdelaine	Reconquête		680	9.83		
Ricardo Bethel	Independent		399	5.77		
Hervé Meunier	Independent		230	3.32		
Lila Krimi	Independent		102	1.47		
Diane Félix	Independent		93	1.34		
Total			6,919	100.00	7,037	100.00
Valid votes			6,919	48.55	7,037	96.41
Invalid votes			100	0.70	83	1.14
Blank votes			7,232	50.75	179	2.45
Total votes			14,251	100.00	7,299	100.00
Registered voters/turnout			25,227	56.49	25,233	28.93
