= Claire Guion-Firmin =

French politician (born 1957)

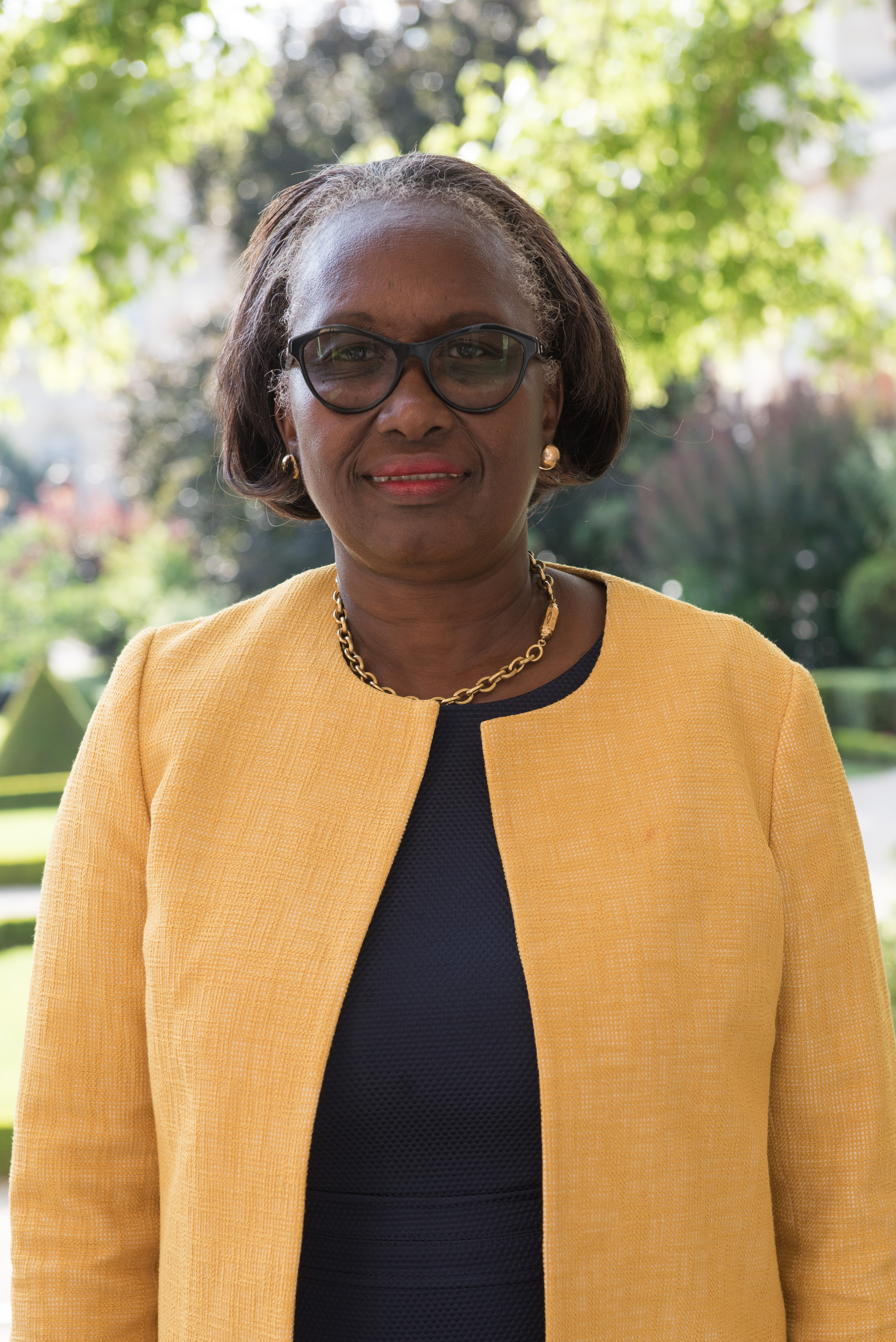

Member of the French National Assembly for Saint Barthélemy and Saint-Martin's 1st constituency
- In office 21 June 2017 – 21 June 2022
- Preceded by: Daniel Gibbs
- Succeeded by: Frantz Gumbs

Member of the Territorial Council of Saint Martin
- In office 8 July 2007 – 25 March 2012
- Preceded by: Office created
- Succeeded by: Louis-Constant Fleming

Municipal councilor of Saint Martin
- In office 2002–2007

Personal details
- Born: Claire Javois; 6 September 1957 (age 68) Saint-Martin, France
- Political party: Miscellaneous right
- Profession: Assistant Hotel Manager

Claire Guion-Firmin (née Javois; born 6 September 1957) is a French Saint Martinois politician. She was elected to the French National Assembly on 18 June 2017, representing the department of Saint Barthélemy and Saint Martin.

Ahead of the 2022 presidential elections, Guion-Firmin publicly declared her support for Michel Barnier as the Republicans’ candidate.

She lost her seat in the first round of the 2022 French legislative election.
