= Louis Mussington =

Saint Martin politician

The Honourable Louis Mussington
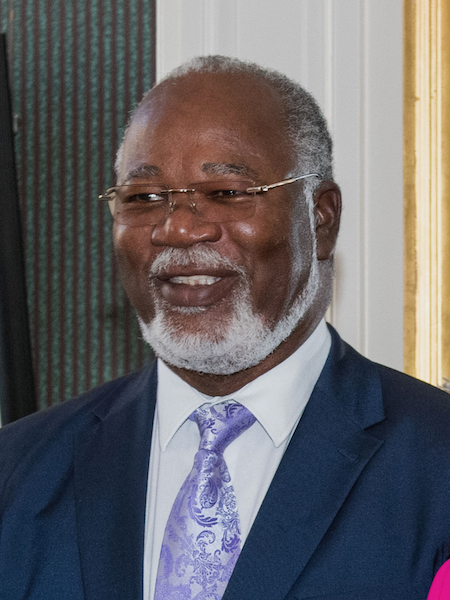
- Mussington in 2023

6th President of the Territorial Council of Saint Martin
- Incumbent
- Assumed office 3 April 2022
- Preceded by: Daniel Gibbs

Personal details
- Born: 9 November 1961 (age 64)
- Party: Rassemblement Saint-Martinois

Louis Mussington (born 9 November 1961) is a French politician who has served as the 6th President of the Territorial Council of Saint Martin since 2022. Prior to his presidency he was a member of the Departmental Council of Guadeloupe, Regional Council of Guadeloupe, and Territorial Council of Saint Martin.

== Early life ==
Louis Mussington was born in the Collectivity of Saint Martin on 9 November 1961.

== Career ==
Mussington, Alain Richardson, and Sujah Reiph formed the Movement of Advancement of the People in 1996, and later renamed it to the Movement for Jutsice and Prosperity (MJP) and then to Saint-Martinois Rally (RSM).

Mussington was elected to the Departmental Council of Guadeloupe from Saint Martin in the 1998 election. He won a seat in the Regional Council of Guadeloupe in the 2004 election. He won a seat on Saint Martin's territorial council in the first election held in 2007.

Mussington was a member of the National Assembly representing Guadeloupe's 4th constituency from 17 June to 19 June 2012.

=== Presidency ===
RSM won control of the territorial council in the 2022 election. Mussington spent €18,818 during the campaign out of the total €96,563 spent by all candidates. Mussington was selected as president with no opposition.

Mussington endorsed Emmanuel Macron during the first round of the 2017 and 2022 presidential elections.

An investigation regarding the misappropriation of public funds and illegal taking of interest was launched into Mussington in 2023. He was taken into custody and interviewed on 14 January 2026, but was released without charges.

== Works cited ==
=== News ===
- "Louis Mussington officially voted in as new President of Collectivité". The Daily Herald. 3 April 2022. Archived from the original on 11 May 2026.
- "President Louis Mussington calls on population to vote for Emmanuel Macron". Saint Martin News Network. 6 April 2022. Archived from the original on 11 May 2026.
- "Saint-Martin: Louis Mussington, le président de la collectivité dans la tourmente?". Patmédias. 7 February 2026. Archived from the original on 11 May 2026.
- Gasnet, Estelle (20 September 2023). "Saint-Martin: Louis Mussington, le président de la collectivité dans la tourmente?". Soualiga Post. Archived from the original on 11 May 2026.
- Vidal, André-Jean (3 April 2022). "Saint-Martin. Louis Mussington est officiellement président de la Collectivité, élu à l'unanimité". Karibinfo. Archived from the original on 11 May 2026.

=== Web ===
- "Louis Mussington". Collectivity of Saint Martin. Archived from the original on 11 May 2026.
- "Louis Mussington". National Assembly. Archived from the original on 11 May 2026.
