= 2022 Saint Martin Territorial Council election =

Territorial Council elections were held in the French overseas collectivity of Saint Martin on 20 March 2022.

== Results ==
Party	First round		Second round		Seats
Party	Votes	%	Votes	%	Seats
Rassemblement Saint-Martinois	2,126	25.38	4,742	49.11	16
Alternative	934	11.15	4,742	49.11	16
Union for Democracy	2,071	24.72	3,216	33.31	5
Generation Hope	1,465	17.49	1,698	17.58	2
Saint Martin with You	1,155	13.79	1,698	17.58	2
Future Saint Martin	626	7.47	1,698	17.58	2
Total	8,377	100.00	9,656	100.00	23
Valid votes	8,377	95.97	9,656	97.31	
Invalid/blank votes	352	4.03	267	2.69	
Total votes	8,729	100.00	9,923	100.00	
Registered voters/turnout	18,962	46.03	18,997	52.23	
Source: Government of Saint Martin

== Analysis ==
As expected, the elections were hotly contested, with five of the six lists managing to qualify for the second round. The latter is necessary, as none of the lists having managed to win the absolute majority of the votes cast in the first round. The Rassemblement Saint-Martinois led by Louis Mussington finished first with 16 seats (an increase of 11), ahead of the Union for Democracy list of the outgoing chairman of the council, Daniel Gibbs, which lost 13 seats.
