= Aline Hanson =

- 2013 inauguration
- Born: 9 October 1949; Saint Martin, overseas région and département of Guadeloupe of France
- Died: 29 June 2017 (aged 67); Pic Paradis, Saint Martin
- Occupations: educator, politician
- Years active: 1974–2017
- Known for: 1st woman president of the Overseas Collectivity of St. Martin

Aline Hanson (9 October 1949 – 29 June 2017) was a native of Saint Martin, who was noted as a teacher and then became the first woman elected president of the Collectivity of Saint Martin. Hanson began her career in education, working as a teacher, advisor to the French government on developing programs for disadvantaged children and principal of Sandy Ground Elementary School. She entered politics, simultaneously working as a teacher, in the mayoral office of Marigot. Serving on numerous island boards and government entities, in 2007 she ran for a seat on the Territorial Council and was elected as a council member. Two years later, she was promoted to the executive council. In 2012, after winning a seat on the council, she was selected as first vice president. When Richardson was forced from office in 2013, Hanson was elected as the first woman to serve as president of the Overseas Collectivity of St. Martin.

== Early life ==
Aline Hanson was born on 9 October 1949 on the island of Saint Martin, an overseas collectivity of France. Raised on the island, she attended her primary schooling in St. Martin and then moved to Guadeloupe to attend Baimbridge High School. Completing her studies, she went to Paris, and earned a degree from École Normale Supérieure.

== Career ==
After completing her studies, Hanson returned to St. Martin and began a teaching career at the Seaside School (French: l'école du Bord de Mer) in 1974. In 1977, she began her political involvement, working with Marigot's Mayor Elie Fleming. After 1982, also worked for the Priority Education Zone (French: Zone d'éducation prioritaire (ZEP)), a French educational program focused on improving graduation rates in schools located in disadvantaged areas. After participating in the creation and establishment of the local center of educational documentation, Hanson worked as a coordinator of various projects for the program and as a documentalist for research about the ZEP. In 1991, she became the principal of Sandy Ground Elementary School, also serving as the director of the Institut Universitaire de Formation des Maîtres (IUFM), a type of normal school to train teachers.

Hoping to improve conditions on the island, Hanson was politically active, joining several organizations. She chaired the Cultural Association of Saint Martin and was the director of the port at Galisbay. In addition, she became a board member of Semsamar, a planned community development company in which the owners who buy the firm's properties own shares in the developed projects. In 2001, Hanson decided to leave the political arena for six years, but returned to politics in 2007 when the Overseas Collectivity of St. Martin was created. She was elected as a councilor for the Rassemblement Responsabilité Réussite (RRR) party. Interested in creating new legislation for collective, she visited Andorra and Saint Pierre and Miquelon to study their laws. In 2009, she was elected to serve on the executive council of the Territorial Council.

In the 2012 elections Hanson was elected as first vice president of the Territorial Council. President Alain Richardson, with three other vice presidents, and two at-large members served as the executive council of the 23-member body. In 2013, President Richardson was removed from office and Hanson was elected as the president of the Overseas Collectivity of St. Martin. She was the first woman to serve in the position and made a goal of her administration the improvement of relations and cooperation between St. Martin and Sint Maarten, the Dutch side of the island. She worked toward a joint operational agreement, which was signed in 2014 to utilize funds from the European Union for development projects, such as a waste management plant, an employment license exchange program, and how those employment benefits effect later pension applications. Hanson was succeeded by Daniel Gibbs in the 2017 election.

== Death and legacy ==
Hanson died on 29 June 2017 from cancer at her home in Pic Paradis.
