= Alliance (Saint Martin) =

The Alliance is a political party in Saint Martin, led by Dominique Riboud. It won in the 1 July and 8 July 2007 Territorial Council elections despite 9.05% none out of 23 seats.
