= Guillaume Arnell =

French politician

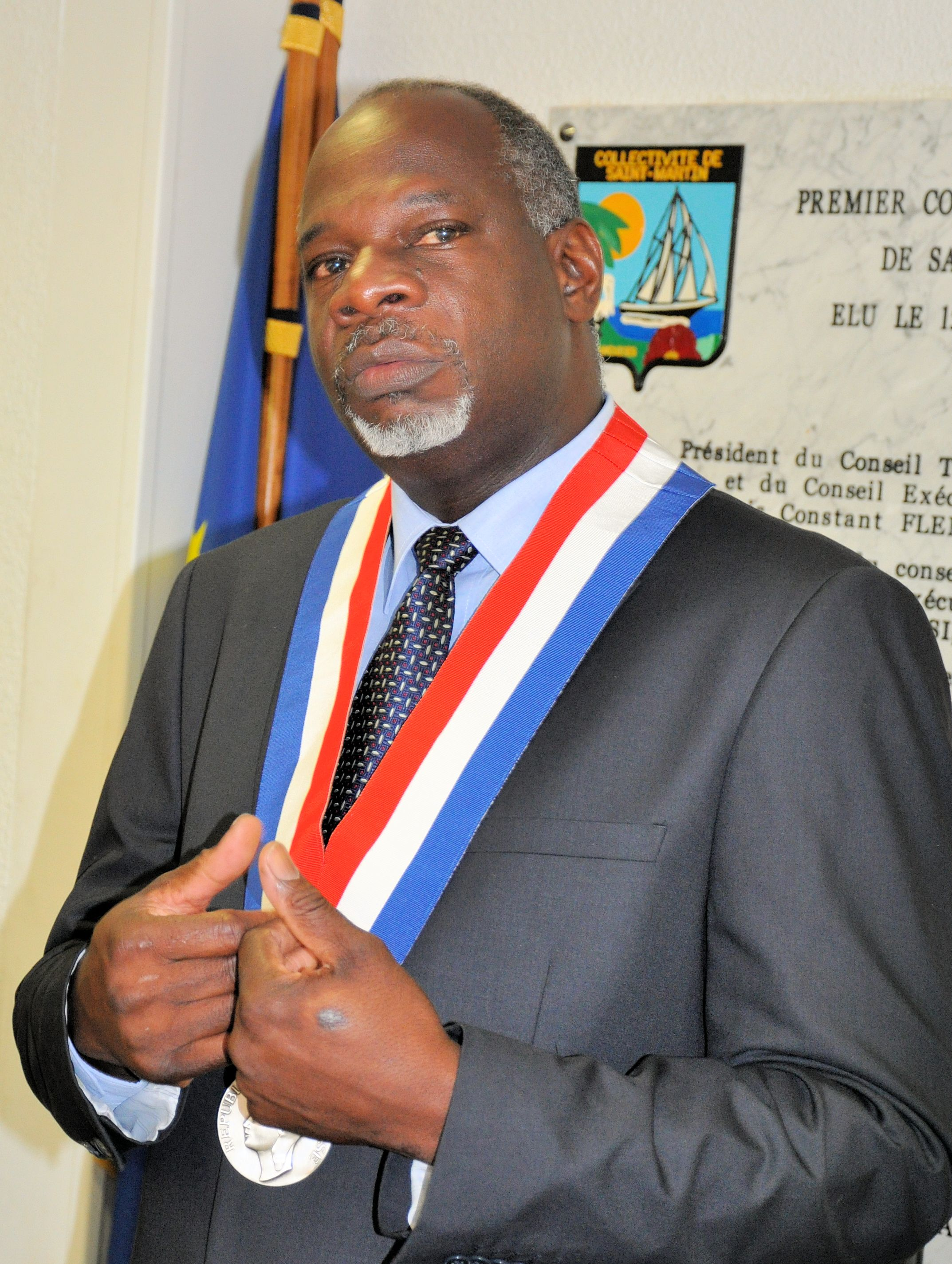
- Arnell in 2012

Senator, French Senate
- In office 1 October 2014 – Incumbent
- Constituency: Saint-Martin

Vice President, Territorial Council of Saint-Martin
- In office 25 March 2012 – Incumbent

Personal details
- Born: 20 January 1958 (age 68)
- Party: Rassemblement Responsabilite Reussite (RRR)
- Occupation: Administrator

Guillaume Arnell (born 19 December 1962) is a member of the Senate of France. He was first elected in 2014, and represents the Saint-Martin Overseas Collectivity. An administrator by profession, he serves as a member of the Rassemblement Responsabilite Reussite (RRR). He has been vice president of the Territorial Council of Saint-Martin since 2012.

== Biography ==
In 1995, with the support of other committed young Saint-Martinois, Guillaume Arnell and Alain Richardson formed Ensemble pour Saint-Martin.

In the cantonal elections of 1998, he was elected general councilor of Guadeloupe for the canton of Saint-Martin-2 and took over from Robert Weinum, general councilor of Guadeloupe for 19 years. Guillaume Arnell was re-elected in 2004.

In 2008, he was a candidate for the RRR group in the senatorial elections, but was defeated.

In the territorial elections of 2012, he was elected again on the RRR list, led by Alain Richardson. The list having won the elections, Alain Richardson becomes president of the community and Guillaume Arnell vice-president of the council. He is responsible for the sustainable development division, which also has skills in housing, construction and town planning.

Candidate in the senatorial elections of September 2014, he was elected in the second round of voting with 11 votes, against eight to Alain Gros-Desormeaux (without label) and four to Dominique Aubert (UMP).
