= 2012 Saint Martin Territorial Council election =

Territorial Council elections were held in the French overseas collectivity of Saint Martin on 18 March and 25 March 2012.

== Results ==
Party	First round		Second round		Seats
Party	Votes	%	Votes	%	Seats
Rally Responsibility Success	3,077	34.13	5,451	56.85	17
Team Daniel Gibbs 2012	2,889	32.04	4,137	43.15	6
Union for Progress–UMP	1,195	13.25			0
Saint Martin for All	847	9.39			0
Movement for the Advancement of the People	670	7.43			0
Solidary Generation	338	3.75			0
Total	9,016	100.00	9,588	100.00	23
Valid votes	9,016	96.90	9,588	97.13	
Invalid/blank votes	288	3.10	283	2.87	
Total votes	9,304	100.00	9,871	100.00	
Registered voters/turnout	17,882	52.03	17,909	55.12	
Source: SMN, SMN
