= 2007 Saint Martin Territorial Council election =

Elections to the Territorial Council were held in the French overseas collectivity of Saint Martin for the first time on 1 July and 8 July 2007. As no list received an absolute majority of the vote in the first round, all lists with more than 10% of the vote contested a second round, in which the list of Louis Constant-Fleming obtained a relative majority.

== Results ==
Party	First round		Second round		Seats
Party	Votes	%	Votes	%	Seats
Union for Progress–UMP	2,829	40.35	3,753	48.96	16
Rally Responsibility Success	2,237	31.90	3,231	42.15	6
Succeed Saint Martin	767	10.94	681	8.88	1
Alliance	635	9.06			0
Democratic Alliance for Saint Martin	544	7.76			0
Total	7,012	100.00	7,665	100.00	23
Valid votes	7,012	97.46	7,665	97.20	
Invalid/blank votes	183	2.54	221	2.80	
Total votes	7,195	100.00	7,886	100.00	
Registered voters/turnout	15,519	46.36	15,522	50.81	
Source: Le Journal, RFO2
