= Succeed Saint Martin =

Succeed Saint Martin (Réussir Saint-Martin) is a political party in Saint Martin, led by Jean-Luc Hamlet. It won in the 1 July and 8 July 2007 Territorial Council elections 1 out of 23 seats.

It's a citizen association whose objective is to be a source of proposals vis-à-vis the elected officials on the theme of Better Living Together
