= Palace of the General Council =

Legislative building of Guadeloupe

Coordinates: 15.9928°N 61.7283°W

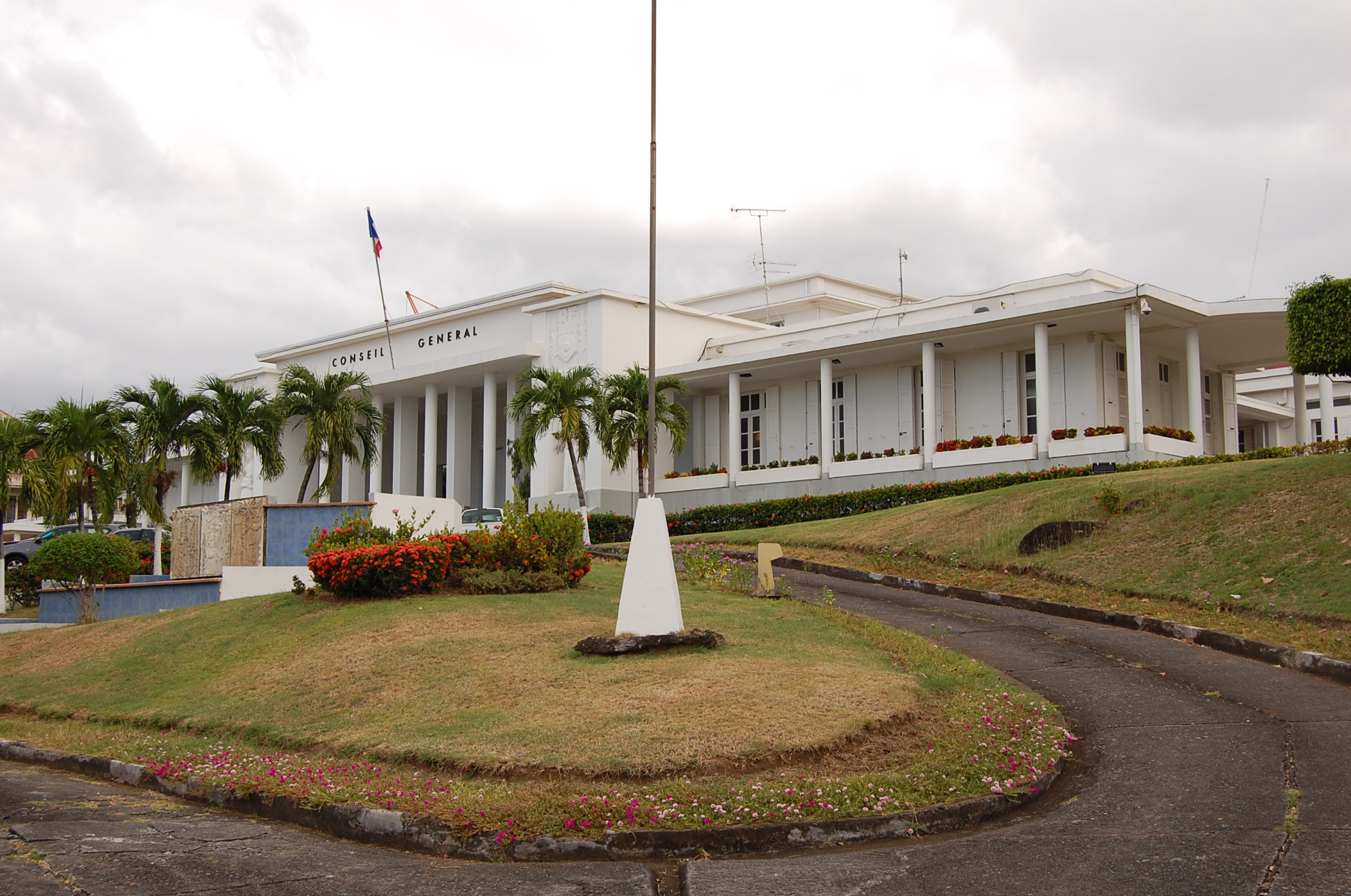
The Palace of the General Council in Basse-Terre.

The Palace of the General Council (French: Palais du conseil général) is the base of the Departmental Council of Guadeloupe.

== History ==
It was built by architect Ali Tur in 1935. It was the last building he designed in the archipelago.

On 15 December 1997, the palace was listed as a historic monument.
