= Union for Democracy (Saint Martin) =

The Union for Democracy (UD) is a Saint Martin political party founded in 2011 by Daniel Gibbs.

== Electoral history ==
=== Parliamentary elections ===
Election year	First Round			Second Round			MPs
Election year	Votes	%	Rank	Votes	%	Rank	MPs
2012 (constituency)	2,639	39.88	1st	4,107	52.23	1st	1 / 1

=== Territorial elections ===
Election year	First Round			Second Round			Seats	+/-
Election year	Votes	%	Rank	Votes	%	Rank	Seats	+/-
2012	2,889	32.04	2nd	4,137	43.15	2nd	6 / 23	
2017	4,077	45.05	1st	5,695	64.31	1st	18 / 23	▲12
2022	2,071	24.72	2nd	3,216	33.31	2nd	5 / 23	▼13
