= Democratic Alliance for Saint Martin =

Political party in Saint Martin

Democratic Alliance for Saint Martin Alliance démocratique pour Saint-Martin
- Leader: Wendel Cocks
- Headquarters: Saint Martin
- Territorial Council: 0 / 23

The Democratic Alliance for Saint Martin (French: Alliance démocratique pour Saint-Martin) is a minor political party in the Collectivity of Saint Martin, a French overseas collectivity in the Caribbean. It is led by Wendel Cocks.

== History ==
The party contested the inaugural 2007 Saint Martin Territorial Council elections, held on 1 and 8 July 2007 after Saint Martin became a separate collectivity. In the first round it received 544 votes (7.76 % of the total vote). It failed to reach the 10 % threshold needed to advance to the second round and won no seats on the 23-member Territorial Council.

== Electoral results ==
Election	Votes (1st round)	%	Seats
2007	544	7.76	0/23
