= Révolution Permanente =

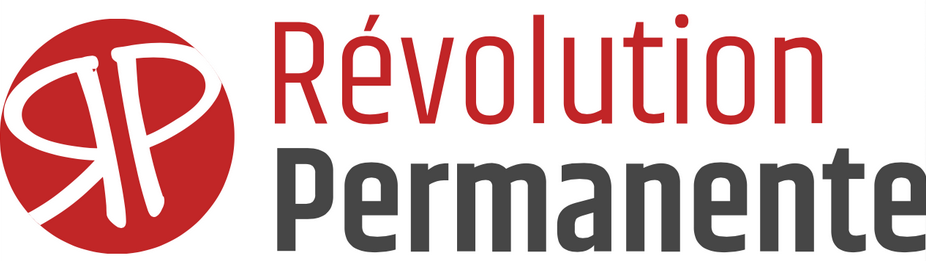
- Leader: Collective leadership
- Main spokesperson: Anasse Kazib; Ariane Anemoyannis; Elsa Marcel; Adrien Cornet
- Founded: April 2011 (as a current of the NPA); December 18, 2022 (as a party)
- Split from: New Anticapitalist Party
- Newspaper: Révolution permanente
- Youth wing: Le Poing Levé
- Women's wing: Bread and Roses
- Ideology: Trotskyism
- Political position: Far-left
- International affiliation: Trotskyist Fraction – Fourth International
- Colors: Red

Website
- revolutionpermanente.fr

Révolution Permanente (RP) is a French trotskyist political party. It was founded in 2022 as the French section of the Trotskyist Fraction – Fourth International, originating from the Courant communiste révolutionnaire (CCR), a tendency of the New Anticapitalist Party (NPA) until 2021. According to La Croix, Adèle Haenel, Assa Traoré and Frédéric Lordon are supporters of the organization.

== History ==
=== Internal current of the NPA ===
The Revolutionary Internationalist Communist Group (CRI) was admitted in 2008 as sympathiser section of the Trotskyist Fraction – Fourth International (TF-FI), but after the creation of the New Anticapitalist Party (NPA) they decided to dissolve within the CLAIRE Tendency of the NPA (acronym for "Tendency for Communism and self-organized, internationalist and revolutionary struggle"). Later, in 2010, the TF-FI militants and the CLAIRE-tendency established "The Collective for a Revolutionary Tendency" (CRT) of the NPA, which joined Platform 4 for the first NPA congress. It advocated for a revolutionary orientation, opposing several other platforms considered too moderate. The CRT was dissolved after NPA's first congress (February 10 - February 13 2011). In April 2011 the "Revolutionary Communist Current" (CCR) was officially founded by the TF-FI militants, after leaving the CLAIRE-tendency in February 13 2011.

=== Departure from the NPA ===
A dispute between the NPA and the CCR led to the latter's departure in 2021. While the CCR accused the NPA of "long-term exclusion" and a rightward shift, the NPA maintained that the CCR had voluntarily left.

At the NPA congress in 2018, the leadership, historically linked to the Revolutionary Communist League (LCR), secured a relative majority. However, the CCR criticized the leadership for prioritizing an alliance with La France Insoumise over revolutionary goals, which they described as a shift towards reformism.

=== Presidential campaign of Anasse Kazib ===
After the CCR's departure, Révolution Permanente endorsed Anasse Kazib's candidacy for the 2022 French presidential election. Kazib's campaign was marked by opposition to systemic racism and fascism, as well as advocacy for worker solidarity. Despite gathering significant public support, the candidacy was marred by media exclusion and threats from far-right groups.

Kazib's campaign faced challenges in securing the necessary endorsements for official candidacy and concluded with 160 endorsements, below the required 500.

=== General strike network ===
In 2023, RP launched the "General Strike Network" in response to the pension reform protests. This initiative included mobilization of workers, intellectuals, and activists, aiming to extend strikes and coordinate grassroots movements. Le Journal du Dimanche noted the rising domination of the Révolution Permanente and its youth group, the Le Poing Levé, during the strikes against the French pension reform of 2023, and Le Monde remarked that the Révolution Permanente's "media visibility" was "disproportionate" to its size during the 2023 protests. According to Arrêt sur images the website of the Révolution Permanente has become indispensable to striking workers.

=== Local elections 2026 ===
The party fielded candidates in six communes, two arrondissements in Paris and Marseille and supported one independent list in Saint-Avold for the 2026 local elections. RP gained 12.564 votes nationally, winning two seats in Saint-Denis (1,894 votes, 7,12%).

== See also ==
- Trotskyism in France
- Permanent revolution
- The Permanent Revolution and Results and Prospects
- List of political parties in France
