= Demographics of French Guiana =

Historical population estimates and average annual growth rate
Year	Pop.	±% p.a.
1790	14,520	—
1839	20,940	+0.75%
1857	25,561	+1.11%
1891	33,500	+0.80%
Source: INSEE estimates

Census population and average annual growth rate
Year	Pop.	±% p.a.
1936	37,005	—
1946	25,499	−3.66%
1954	27,863	+1.11%
1961	33,505	+2.67%
1967	44,392	+4.80%
1974	55,125	+3.14%
1982	73,022	+3.58%
1990	114,678	+5.80%
1999	156,790	+3.54%
2007	213,031	+3.91%
2012	239,648	+2.38%
2017	268,700	+2.31%
2023	293,996	+1.51%
Source: SPLAF (1954-1961) and INSEE (1967-2023)

The demographics of French Guiana are characterized by a young population with 32% below the age of 15 in 2023. The total population stood at 293,996 as of 1 January 2023. The demographic profile is a reflection of the territory's high fertility rates. Regarding nationality, as of 2010, 64.5% of the population had French nationality, while 35.5% were of foreign nationality with significant communities from Suriname, Haiti, and Brazil among others.

== Population ==
According to INSEE the population of French Guiana was 293,996 as of 1 January 2023. The population is very young: 32% are below the age of 15, while only 1.2% are 80 years or older. The age distribution is a reflection of the high fertility rates of French Guiana.

=== Structure of the population ===
Population Estimates by Sex and Age Group (01.01.2010) (Provisional) :

Age group	Male	Female	Total	%
Total	113 824	116 617	230 441	100
0-4	14 591	13 849	28 440	12.34
5-9	14 090	13 618	27 708	12.02
10-14	12 843	12 024	24 867	10.79
15-19	10 729	10 672	21 401	9.29
20-24	7 728	8 478	16 206	7.03
25-29	7 281	9 109	16 390	7.11
30-34	7 692	8 676	16 368	7.10
35-39	7 877	8 865	16 742	7.27
40-44	7 415	7 650	15 065	6.54
45-49	6 698	6 582	13 280	5.76
50-54	5 397	5 148	10 545	4.58
55-59	4 207	4 107	8 314	3.61
60-64	2 931	2 684	5 615	2.44
65-69	1 740	1 693	3 433	1.49
70-74	1 083	1 260	2 343	1.02
75-79	752	974	1 726	0.75
80-84	433	619	1 052	0.46
85-89	225	402	627	0.27
90-94	77	144	221	0.10
95+	35	63	98	0.04
Age group	Male	Female	Total	Percent
0-14	41 524	39 491	81 015	35.16
15-64	67 955	71 971	139 926	60.72
65+	4 345	5 155	9 500	4.12

Population by Sex and Age Group (Census 01.I.2015):

Age group	Male	Female	Total	%
Total	128 973	130 892	259 865	100
0–4	14 800	14 161	28 961	11.14
5–9	15 050	14 512	29 563	11.38
10–14	14 151	14 085	28 237	10.87
15–19	12 158	11 784	23 941	9.21
20–24	8 960	9 569	18 529	7.13
25–29	8 674	9 890	18 563	7.14
30–34	9 230	9 846	19 077	7.34
35–39	9 068	9 326	18 394	7.08
40–44	8 701	8 949	17 650	6.79
45–49	7 357	7 359	14 715	5.66
50–54	6 042	6 091	12 133	4.67
55–59	5 010	4 941	9 951	3.83
60–64	3 959	3 790	7 749	2.98
65-69	2 574	2 464	5 038	1.94
70-74	1 496	1 570	3 066	1.18
75-79	860	999	1 859	0.72
80-84	479	758	1 237	0.48
85-89	257	466	723	0.28
90-94	102	254	356	0.14
95-99	32	68	100	0.04
100+	13	10	23	0.01
Age group	Male	Female	Total	Percent
0–14	44 001	42 758	86 759	33.39
15–64	79 159	81 545	160 704	61.84
65+	5 813	6 589	12 402	4.77

Population Estimates by Sex and Age Group (01.I.2021):

Age group	Male	Female	Total	%
Total	140 463	150 065	290 528	100
0–4	15 210	15 355	30 565	10.52
5–9	15 253	15 368	30 621	10.54
10–14	15 265	15 006	30 271	10.42
15–19	13 697	13 899	27 596	9.50
20–24	10 402	10 901	21 303	7.33
25–29	8 367	10 345	18 712	6.44
30–34	9 119	11 051	20 170	6.94
35–39	9 170	10 909	20 079	6.91
40–44	8 884	9 650	18 534	6.38
45–49	7 891	8 787	16 678	5.74
50–54	7 211	7 412	14 623	5.03
55–59	6 107	6 372	12 479	4.30
60–64	5 009	5 165	10 174	3.50
65-69	3 714	3 705	7 419	2.55
70-74	2 440	2 545	4 985	1.72
75-79	1 394	1 559	2 953	1.02
80-84	744	1 012	1 756	0.60
85-89	397	539	936	0.32
90-94	118	297	415	0.14
95-99	42	142	184	0.06
100+	29	46	75	0.03
Age group	Male	Female	Total	Percent
0–14	45 728	45 729	91 457	31.48
15–64	85 857	94 491	180 348	62.08
65+	8 878	9 845	18 723	6.44

== Vital statistics ==
The total fertility rate in French Guiana has remained high and is today considerably higher than in metropolitan France, and also higher than the average of the French overseas departments. It is largely responsible for the high population growth of French Guiana.

	Average population	Live births	Deaths	Natural change	Crude birth rate (per 1000)	Crude death rate (per 1000)	Natural change (per 1000)	Total fertility rate
1936	24,000	355	554	-199	14.8	23.1	-8.3	
1937	24,000	408	487	-79	17.0	20.3	-3.3	
1938	24,000	381	649	-268	15.9	27.0	-11.2	
1939	24,000	333	499	-166	13.9	20.8	-6.9	
1940	24,000	436	505	-69	18.2	21.0	-2.9	
1941	24,000	437	626	-189	18.2	26.1	-7.9	
1942	24,000	453	733	-280	18.9	30.5	-11.7	
1943	24,000	422	702	-280	17.6	29.3	-11.7	
1944	24,000	474	627	-153	19.8	26.1	-6.4	
1945	24,000	620	539	81	25.8	22.5	3.4	
1946	24,000	515	596	-81	21.5	24.8	-3.4	
1947	24,000	539	623	-84	22.5	26.0	-3.5	
1948	25,000	529	547	-18	21.2	21.9	-0.7	
1949	25,000	607	471	136	24.3	18.8	5.4	
1950	25,000	590	384	206	23.6	15.4	8.2	
1951	26,000	558	383	175	21.5	14.7	6.7	
1952	27,000	781	462	319	30.0	17.8	12.3	
1953	27,000	720	426	294	26.7	15.8	10.9	
1954	28,000	900	378	522	32.1	13.5	18.6	
1955	29,000	941	377	564	32.6	13.0	19.5	
1956	29,000	949	411	538	32.1	13.9	18.2	
1957	30,000	993	426	567	33.0	14.2	18.8	
1958	31,000	940	404	536	30.9	13.3	17.6	
1959	31,000	1,043	460	583	34.1	15.0	19.1	
1960	32,000	1,026	451	575	31.4	13.8	17.6	
1961	34,000	1,066	487	579	31.8	14.5	17.3	
1962	35,000	1,041	410	631	30.1	11.8	18.2	
1963	36,000	1,118	446	672	31.1	12.4	18.7	
1964	38,000	1,213	399	814	32.0	10.5	21.5	
1965	39,000	1,161	403	758	29.0	10.1	19.0	
1966	41,000	1,244	401	843	29.5	9.5	20.0	
1967	43,000	1,281	376	905	29.2	8.6	20.6	
1968	45,000	1,390	408	982	30.4	8.9	21.5	
1969	47,000	1,424	431	993	30.0	9.1	20.9	
1970	49,000	1,584	385	1,199	32.2	7.8	24.4	
1971	50,000	1,600	400	1,200	31.4	7.8	23.5	
1972	52,000	1,670	399	1,271	31.7	7.6	24.1	
1973	54,000	1,473	418	1,055	27.1	7.7	19.4	
1974	55,000	1,529	435	1,094	27.4	7.8	19.6	
1975	57,000	1,476	408	1,068	25.6	7.1	18.5	
1976	59,000	1,439	415	1,024	24.2	7.0	17.2	
1977	61,000	1,476	463	1,013	24.0	7.5	16.4	
1978	63,000	1,568	470	1,098	24.5	7.4	17.2	
1979	65,000	1,704	454	1,250	25.7	6.9	18.9	
1980	68,000	1,933	468	1,465	28.1	6.8	21.3	
1981	71,000	2,092	428	1,664	29.3	6.0	23.3	
1982	74,000	2,379	492	1,887	31.6	6.5	25.1	
1983	78,000	2,314	489	1,825	28.9	6.1	22.8	
1984	83,000	2,319	491	1,828	27.3	5.8	21.5	
1985	87,000	2,482	501	1,981	27.6	5.6	22.0	
1986	93,000	2,392	491	1,901	25.2	5.2	20.0	
1987	99,000	2,700	550	2,150	27.2	5.6	21.7	
1988	105,000	3,000	550	2,450	28.5	5.2	23.2	
1989	111,000	3,300	550	2,750	29.6	4.9	24.7	
1990	113,351	3,606	594	3,012	30.8	5.1	25.7	
1991	117,327	3,922	583	3,339	32.2	4.8	27.4	
1992	121,469	4,045	568	3,477	32.0	4.5	27.5	
1993	125,786	4,113	578	3,535	31.5	4.4	27.1	
1994	130,282	4,188	618	3,570	31.5	4.6	26.8	
1995	134,968	4,264	540	3,671	30.7	3.9	26.8	
1996	139,848	4,331	556	3,775	30.4	3.8	26.6	
1997	144,937	4,426	598	3,828	30.1	3.8	26.3	
1998	150,242	4,696	607	4,089	30.6	4.0	26.6	3.83
1999	155,760	4,907	648	4,259	30.9	4.1	26.8	3.87
2000	162,018	5,149	635	4,514	31.2	3.8	27.4	3.94
2001	168,614	5,140	660	4,480	29.9	3.9	26.0	3.79
2002	176,638	5,276	669	4,607	29.4	3.7	25.7	3.73
2003	184,792	5,553	721	4,832	29.7	3.9	25.8	3.77
2004	193,167	5,312	719	4,593	27.3	3.7	23.6	3.47
2005	199,206	5,998	705	5,293	29.7	3.5	26.2	3.79
2006	205,954	6,276	711	5,565	30.1	3.4	26.7	3.80
2007	213,031	6,386	690	5,696	29.8	3.2	26.6	3.74
2008	219,266	6,247	762	5,485	28.4	3.5	24.9	3.57
2009	224,469	6,171	699	5,472	27.4	3.1	24.3	3.50
2010	229,040	6,082	773	5,309	26.3	3.3	23.0	3.37
2011	237,549	6,259	714	5,545	26.4	3.0	23.4	3.42
2012	239,648	6,609	789	5,820	27.2	3.2	24.0	3.60
2013	244,118	6,474	767	5,707	26.1	3.1	23.0	3.47
2014	252,338	6,591	786	5,805	25.9	3.1	22.8	3.44
2015	259,865	6,806	834	5,972	26.2	3.2	23.0	3.44
2016	269,352	7,270	901	6,369	26.9	3.3	23.6	3.61
2017	268,700	8,057	964	7,093	29.6	3.5	26.1	3.92
2018	276,128	7,995	899	7,096	28.7	3.2	25.5	3.82
2019	281,678	8,104	1,020	7,084	28.6	3.6	25.0	3.82
2020	285,133	7,992	990	7,002	28.0	3.5	24.5	3.75
2021	286,618	8,127	1,365	6,762	28.3	4.7	23.6	3.81
2022	288,382	7,718	1,210	6,508	26.5	4.2	22.3	3.61
2023	290,110	7,689	1,228	6,461	26.1	4.2	21.9	3.57
2024	291,774	6,849	1,191	5,658	23.1	4.0	19.1	3.05
2025	292,354	6,630			22.5	4.0	18.5	2.89

=== Infant mortality rate ===
The infant mortality in French Guiana is higher than in metropolitan France:

- 2007-2009: 12.0
- 2008-2010: 11.6
- 2009-2011: 10.1

=== Life expectancy ===
At birth, life expectancy is 76.2 years for male children, and 82.8 for female (figures for 2011).

== Ethnic groups ==
Estimates of the percentages of French Guiana ethnic composition vary, a situation compounded by the large proportion of immigrants.

Creoles, or Mulattoes (people of mixed African and French ancestry), are the largest ethnic group, though estimates vary as to the exact percentage, depending upon whether the large Haitian community is included as well. Generally the Creole population is judged to be about 60 to 70% of the total population if Haitians (comprising roughly one-third of Creoles) are included, and 30 to 50% without.

Roughly 41,000 people or 14% of the population of French Guiana is of European ancestry. The vast majority of these are of French heritage, though there are also people of Dutch, British, Spanish and Portuguese ancestry.

The main Asian communities are the Chinese (about 3-4%, primarily from Zhejiang province in mainland China and Hong Kong) and Hmong from Laos (1-2%). There are also smaller groups from various Caribbean islands, mainly Saint Lucia as well as Dominica. Other Asian groups include Indians, Lebanese and Vietnamese.

The main groups living in the interior are the Maroons (formerly called "Bush Negroes") who are from African descent, and Amerindians. The Maroons, descendants of escaped African slaves, live primarily along the Maroni River. The main Maroon groups are the Saramaka, Ndyuka (both of whom also live in Suriname), and Boni (Aluku). The Maroons are the fastest growing ethnic group, and as of 2018 constitute about one-third of the total population with an estimated population of close to 100,000 people.

The main Amerindian groups (estimated population about 10,000) are the Aparai, Kalina, Lokono, Palikur, Teko, Wayampi and Wayana. The estimated population for the beginning of the 17th century was 30,000 people. Until the middle of the 20th century, there was a sharp decline in population to almost 1,200 people in 1961 which was mainly caused by European diseases. Improved health care managed to turn the tide.

=== Nationality ===
As of 2020, Brazilians have become the largest foreign nationality in French Guiana, which has somewhat altered the composition of the foreign population there.

On 1 January 2010, 64.5% of the population had French nationality, while 35.5% had a foreign nationality. Of these, Surinamese (13.8% of the total population), Haitians (8.8%) and Brazilians (8.7%) were the largest groups. Smaller groups included people with nationality of Guyana (1.7%), Colombia (1.0%), China (0.5%), the Dominican Republic (0.4%) and Peru (0.2%).

Country of birth	Population	Source
Brazil	92,493 (official data in 2023 source)	Gov.br
Metropolitan France	24,000 (data of 2020 source)	Ulaval.ca
Surinam	19,000 − 32,000	
Haiti	24,000 − 28,000	
Dominican Republic	20,000 (official data in source)	la1ere.fr
Venezuela	19,000	
Peru	2,500 (official data in 2023 source)	Gob.pe
Colombia	2,500	

== Languages ==
French and French Guianese Creole (a local French-based creole) are the most widely spoken languages. There are also several native languages, including Arawakan (Arawak and Palikúr), Cariban (Carib and Wayana), and Tupi-Guarani (Emerillon and Wayampi) languages. On the border with Suriname, Maroon people use the English-based creoles of Ndyuka and Sranan Tongo (both spoken in Suriname) as lingua francas, while immigrant languages spoken include Antillean Creole, Brazilian Portuguese, Haitian Creole, Hakka Chinese, Hmong and Javanese. The official language, like for all overseas departments and territories of France, is French.

== Religion ==
Religion in French Guiana (ARDA 2015)
1. Catholic Church (74.3%)
2. Protestant (9.90%)
3. Christian syncretic (3.50%)
4. Chinese folk religion (2.90%)
5. Hinduism (1.60%)
6. Other religion (4.40%)
7. No religion (3.40%)

The dominant religion of French Guiana is Catholicism; some of the Maroons and Amerindian people maintain their own religions, however large tribes like the Kalina, Ndyuka have been Christianized.

== See also ==
- Demographics of France
