= Frantz Gumbs =

Frantz Gumbs (born 21 January 1954) is a French Saint Martinois politician from La République En Marche! and Saint-Martinois Rally. He is Member of Parliament for Saint-Barthélemy and Saint-Martin's 1st constituency after defeating Republicans MP Claire Guion-Firmin in the 2022 French legislative election.

== Biography ==
Frantz Gumbs was born on January 21, 1954, in Collectivity of Saint Martin(French West Indies). He was elected territorial councilor of Saint Martin on July 8, 2007, to the territorial council of Saint Martin on the Union for Progress list led by Louis-Constant Fleming (UMP). When Louis-Constant Fleming resigned due to his disqualification, Frantz Gumbs was elected president of the executive council of Saint Martin on August 7, 2008.

His election as president was invalidated: “the main reason for the invalidation was the presence of pre-printed ballots bearing the name of Frantz Gumbs during the election.” The Conseil d'État confirmed that voting procedures had not been followed. A new election, this time in accordance with the rules, was held on May 5, 2009, and Frantz Gumbs was re-elected president of the executive council.

He ran in the 2012 territorial elections on the Union for Progress list led by Louis-Constant Fleming. This list did not make it through to the second round.

He was Deputy (France) as a representative in the 2022 legislative elections in Saint Barthélemy and Saint Martin.

== See also ==
- List of deputies of the 16th National Assembly of France
