= Elsa Marcel =

French politician and lawyer (born 1992)

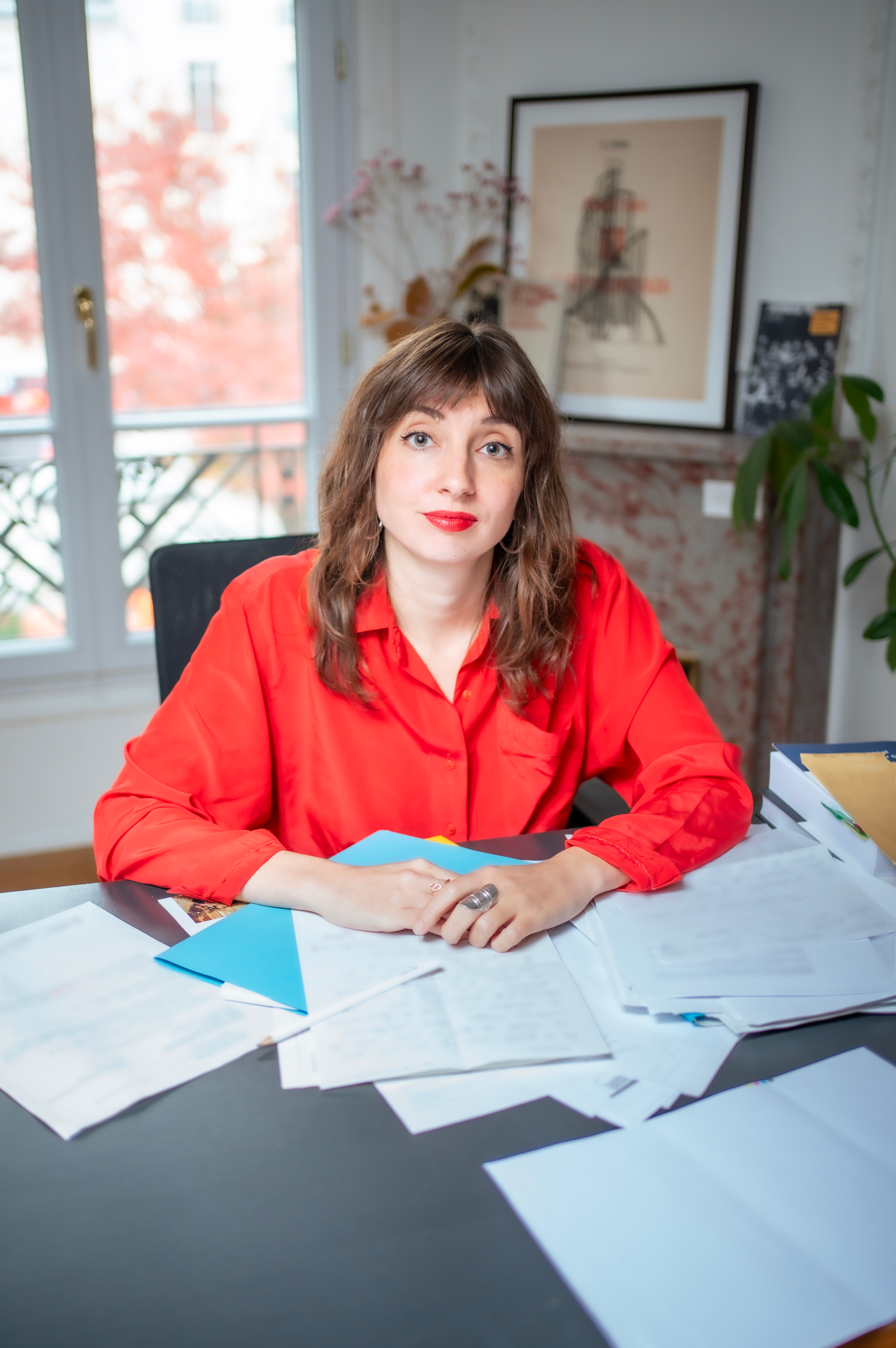
- Marcel in 2026

Saint-Denis municipal councillor
- Incumbent
- Assumed office 21 March 2026

Spokesperson of Révolution Permanente

Personal details
- Born: 20 December 1992 (age 33) Memphis, Tennessee, United States
- Citizenship: France; United States
- Party: New Anticapitalist Party (2014–2022); Révolution Permanente (2022–present)
- Occupation: Lawyer

Elsa Marcel (born 20 December 1992) is a French Trotskyist politician and lawyer. She is the spokesperson of Révolution Permanente. She has served as a member of the municipal council of Saint-Denis since 2026.

== Biography ==
Elsa Marcel was born on 20 December 1992 in Memphis, Tennessee to a father who worked as a senior executive and a mother who was a primary school teacher. When she was two years old, her family returned to France and settled in the Paris suburbs. She has lived in Saint-Denis since 2015.

She joined the New Anticapitalist Party (NPA) in 2014, before becoming involved in the protests against the 2016 labour law. Called to the bar in 2021, she specialized in labour law and activist criminal defence. She joined Révolution Permanente following the split with the NPA in 2022 and became its spokesperson and leading advocate. She has also represented individuals arrested during the Nahel Merzouk riots, activists from the Sainte-Soline protest, and pro-Palestinian activists.

Marcel was the substitute candidate for Anasse Kazib in Seine-Saint-Denis's 2nd constituency during the 2024 French legislative election. Their list received 3.88% of the vote. She subsequently stood as a candidate in the 2026 municipal elections in Saint-Denis under the Révolution Permanente banner. Her platform centred on the requisitioning of vacant housing and of the Olympic Village for the benefit of poorly housed residents of the town, which has one of the highest overcrowding rates in the country, as well as on combating police violence, including a proposal for the complete disarmament of the municipal police. Her list won 1,894 votes, or 7.12% of votes cast, securing two seats on the municipal council.

In 2026, she defended Kazib in a trial concerning charges of glorifying terrorism brought against him. She was also chosen by the parents of a teenager at the centre of a media controversy to defend his interests; Marcel believing him to be a victim of a "wave of racist hatred" stemming from a "media campaign launched by far-right figures".

== Publications ==
In 2026, Marcel published her first book, entitled État de droit, ordre bourgeois. Renouer avec la défense politique ("Rule of Law, Bourgeois Order: Reconnecting with Political Defense"), with La Fabrique Éditions. In it, she develops a critique of the conception of justice and the rule of law as neutral institutions that safeguard democratic rights. In her view, when the social order or political power is challenged, the various components of the judicial system contribute to the maintenance of the established order.
