= Anasse Kazib =

French trade unionist and political activist

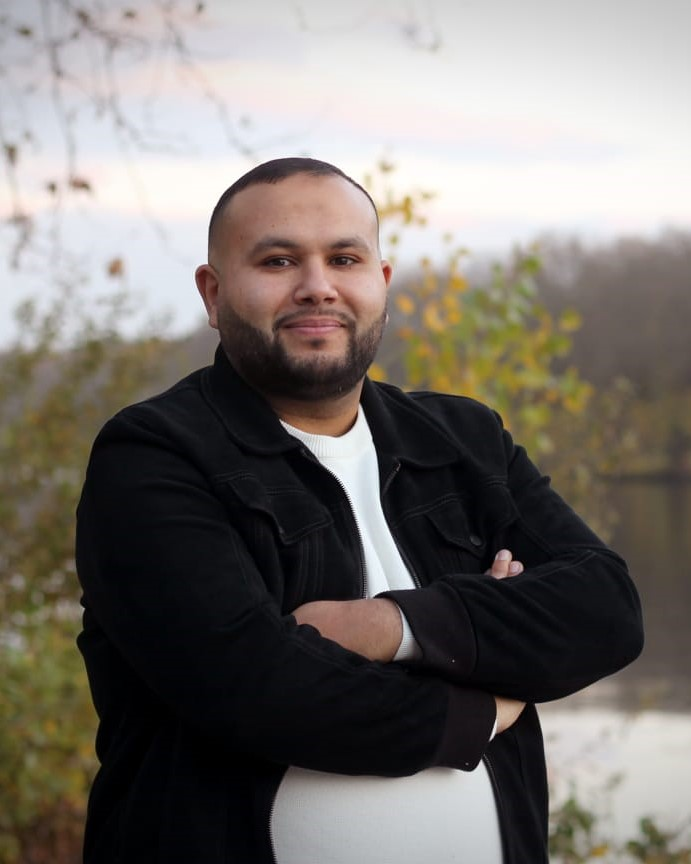
- Kazib in 2021

Personal details
- Born: 2 January 1987 (age 39) Sarcelles, France
- Party: Révolution Permanente (2021–present)
- Other political affiliations: New Anticapitalist Party (2017–2021)
- Website: anassekazib.fr

Anasse Kazib (born 2 January 1987) is a French railway worker, trade-unionist and trotskyist political activist. He was active in the 2018 railway strikes in France and became a visible news commentator and organizer in subsequent social movements. He attempted to run for the French presidency in 2022 and stood as a candidate in the 2024 legislative elections for the movement Révolution Permanente.

== Early life and background ==
Anasse Kazib was born in 1987 in Sarcelles (Val-d'Oise) into a family of five children. He grew up in Sarcelles. His grandfather served as a Moroccan rifleman during World War II. His parents are originally from Essaouira and arrived in France in the early 1970s.

Kazib worked as a courier for chemical laboratories before becoming a railway worker. In 2012 he became a signalman at the marshalling yard in Le Bourget. At the time he earned around €1,800 per month including bonuses. His wife has also been employed by the SNCF in the Paris Nord region since the mid-2000s; they married at age 21 and have two children.

His father worked as a signalman at the SNCF and was employed on a contract basis; as a Moroccan national he could not obtain the same civil-service status as his French colleagues, a discriminatory situation later recognized in legal proceedings in 2018 relating to the "Chibanis" case.

== Trade union involvement and political activism ==
=== Early activism ===
Kazib says he was raised in a family with left-wing allegiances, voting either for the Socialist Party or Lutte ouvrière. He first took part in a demonstration during the 2005 riots and again the following year in protests against the "contrat première embauche" while still at lycée.

=== Union delegate at Le Bourget ===
Affiliated with SUD Rail Paris-Nord, Kazib helped form a local section at Le Bourget in 2014 and was chosen as its union delegate in 2015. The section counted forty-four members in 2018.

He participated in the movement opposing the 2016 labour law; during this period he was introduced to Trotskyism by the railway unionist Laura Varlet (formerly of the Argentine Socialist Workers' Party), discovered Marx's *Communist Manifesto* and Trotsky's writings, and in 2017 joined the Courant communiste révolutionnaire, a faction to the left of the New Anticapitalist Party. He collaborated with the news site Révolution permanente and described himself as a revolutionary Marxist.

=== 2018 strike and rising news media profile ===
In 2018 Kazib was active in strikes opposing the opening of the rail sector to competition and the end of statutory recruitment. He criticized the tactic of staggered strikes and the union leadership's "bureaucrats", becoming a notable figure within the "AG de Paris Nord" union base. The law reform was nevertheless adopted in June 2018.

From March 2018 he frequently appeared on talk shows including LCI, CNews, C8 and RT France, increasing his national visibility as a railway activist. He joined the radio programme Les Grandes Gueules on RMC in May 2018 as a regular fortnightly commentator (three times per month), alternating news work with his job as a railway worker; hosts appreciated his profile as a committed rank-and-file railwayman who did not speak like typical union leaders. On the programme he frequently used Marxist terminology, condemned capitalism and denounced police violence; his visibility led to racist harassment on internet platforms. He was removed from Les Grandes Gueules in March 2020. He continued to appear on other television programmes such as Touche pas à mon poste ! on C8.

During the Yellow vests movement, Kazib linked with figures such as Jérôme Rodrigues and participated in the 2019–2020 social protests against pension reform.

=== Involvement in 2021 railway workers' strikes ===
In early 2021, Kazib participated actively in strikes by railway workers on the Paris Nord network, criticizing the degrading working conditions, such as dirty and dangerous tunnels infested with rats and cockroaches. He demanded the resignation of SNCF CEO Jean-Pierre Farandou.

== Presidential pre-candidacy (2021–2022) ==
Kazib declared a "pre-candidacy" for the 2022 presidential election on 4 April 2021 during an NPA (New Anticapitalist Party) political council. The candidature was rejected by the majority branch of the party amid internal tensions between a radical faction (including the Courant communiste révolutionnaire) and a more moderate faction open to rapprochements with La France Insoumise. The Courant communiste révolutionnaire left the NPA in June 2021, depriving the party of about 300 activists; the NPA ultimately presented Philippe Poutou as its candidate.

After launching his own campaign Kazib was targeted by a campaign of online harassment and death threats from the extreme right. In February 2022 racist posters appeared at Sorbonne where he had been invited to speak. Kazib complained of marginalization in news coverage: between 1 January and 18 February 2022 his total airtime across radio and television amounted to five minutes, according to ARCOM. Arrêt sur images noted his frequent absence from televised lists of candidates ranked by sponsorship numbers.

On 9 February 2022 Kazib was scheduled for a Q&A at Panthéon-Sorbonne's Centre Panthéon. Following prior intimidation campaigns by the extreme right, several hundred students gathered in support before the conference; organisers moved the event outdoors because the allocated amphitheatre was too small. The rally drew more than 450 people and included support from Assa Traoré, Bruno Gaccio and SOS Racisme. The university denounced the gathering and Kazib was summoned on 18 February by the public prosecutor for "holding a demonstration on public highways without declaration".

Kazib officially submitted his candidacy for the presidential election on 16 February 2022. He collected 122 sponsorships from elected officials, including 87 mayors and 23 city councillors. His platform focused on increasing the minimum wage, defending public services, opposing pension reforms, and opposing neoliberal policies.

Kazib presented a platform described as communist, revolutionary, ecological, anti-imperialist and opposed to discrimination, with an emphasis on youth. Supporters included Assa Traoré, journalist Taha Bouhafs, sociologist Kaoutar Harchi and transfeminist activist Sasha Yaropolskaïa. However, his organisation did not obtain the required number of sponsorships (it collected 160 validated sponsorships) and he was not accepted on the official presidential ballot.

== Legislative campaign (2024) ==
After the dissolution of the National Assembly on 9 June 2024, Kazib stood as a candidate in the early legislative elections for the second constituency of Seine-Saint-Denis under the Révolution permanente label, with Elsa Marcel as his substitute. He obtained 3.67% of the vote in the first round.

== Positions and legal proceedings ==
In October 2023, after the Hamas attack on Israel, Kazib shared footage of fighters crossing the Israeli border and declared his "support for the Palestinian people standing up to that bloodthirsty state that is Israel". He became the subject of an investigation for "apologie du terrorisme" (apologising for terrorism). Kazib argued that the French state sought to criminalise any solidarity with the Palestinian people.

By April 2025 the prosecution had decided to proceed and Kazib was scheduled to be tried for his pro-Palestine online posts. His case was raised internationally and mobilised petitions and support from numerous public figures who characterised the prosecution as part of a broader crackdown on Palestine solidarity activism.
