= Saint-Barthélemy and Saint-Martin's 1st constituency =

Constituency of the French Fifth Republic

1st constituency of Saint Barthélemy and Saint Martin
- inline Constituency of the National Assembly of France
- Deputy: Frantz Gumbs; DVC
- Department: Saint Barthélemy Saint Martin
- Cantons: Saint Barthélemy, Saint Martin
- Registered voters: 25,233

The 1st constituency of Saint Barthélemy and Saint-Martin is a French legislative constituency covering the two overseas collectivities of Saint Barthélemy and Saint Martin.

== Deputies ==
Election	Member	Party
2012	Daniel Gibbs	UMP
2017	Claire Javois	LR
2022	Frantz Gumbs	RSM
2024	Frantz Gumbs	RSM

== Election results ==
=== 2024 ===
Candidate	Party	Alliance	First round		Second round	
Candidate	Party	Alliance	Votes	%	Votes	%
Frantz Gumbs	DVC	Ensemble	2,867	41.44	3,942	56.02
Alexandra Questel	DVD		1,378	19.92	3,095	43.98
Philippe Philidor	DVD		1,170	16.91		
Clément Chapdelaine	REC		680	9.83		
Ricardo Bethel	DIV		399	5.77		
Hervé Meunier	DIV		230	3.32		
Lila Krimi	DIV		102	1.47		
Diane Felix	DIV		93	1.34		
Valid votes			6,919	100.00	7,037	100.00
Blank votes			213	2.95	179	2.45
Null votes			100	1.38	83	1.14
Turnout			7,232	28.67	7,299	28.93
Abstentions			17,995	71.33	17,934	71.07
Registered voters			25,227		25,233	
Result			DVC HOLD			

=== 2022 ===
Legislative Election 2022: Saint-Barthélemy and Saint-Martin's 1st constituency
Party	Candidate	Votes	%	±%
DVC	Frantz Gumbs	2,383	47.09	+25.34
LR	Daniel Gibbs*	1,398	27.62	N/A
REC	Béatrice Caze	447	8.83	N/A
LR	Claire Javois	330	6.52	−19.49
Independent	Sabrina Riviere-Bonzom	304	6.01	N/A
Independent	Victor Paines-Stephen	199	3.93	N/A
Turnout		5,061	21.25	−2.77
2nd round result
DVC	Frantz Gumbs	3,921	67.21	+21.94
LR	Daniel Gibbs*	1,913	32.79	N/A
Turnout		5,834	24.56	−1.55
DVC gain from LR				

* LR dissident

=== 2017 ===
Legislative Election 2017: Saint-Barthélemy and Saint-Martin 1st - 2nd round
Party	Candidate	Votes	%	±%
LR	Claire Javois	3,462	54.73	
LREM	Inès Bouchaut-Choisy	2,864	45.27	
Turnout		6,636	26.11	
LR hold		Swing		

°

Legislative Election 2017: Saint-Barthélemy and Saint-Martin 1st - 1st round
Party	Candidate	Votes	%	±%
LR	Claire Javois	1,538	26.01	
LREM	Inès Bouchaut-Choisy	1,286	21.75	
Independent	Jacques Hamlet	1,122	18.98	
Independent	Marthe Ogoundélé-Tessi	600	10.15	
Independent	René Arnell	331	5.60	
FN	Patrick Ouvrard	279	4.72	
Independent	Anne-Karine Fleming	216	3.65	
EELV	Benoît Chauvin	185	3.13	
Independent	Patricia Chance-Duzant	127	2.15	
Independent	René-Jean Duret	121	2.05	
Independent	Richard-Antoine Lédée	61	1.03	
UPR	Grégory Isambourg	27	0.46	
Independent	Cyril Dieumegard	19	0.32	
Turnout		6,099	24.02	

=== 2012 ===
Legislative Election 2012: Saint-Barthélemy and Saint-Martin 1st - 2nd round
Party	Candidate	Votes	%	±%
UMP	Daniel Gibbs	4,108	52.29	
Independent	Guillaume Arnell	3,748	47.71	
Turnout		8,154	35.86	
UMP hold		Swing		

Legislative Election 2012: Saint-Barthélemy and Saint-Martin 1st - 1st Round
Party	Candidate	Votes	%	±%
UMP	Daniel Gibbs	2,639	39.88	
Independent	Guillaume Arnell	1,695	25.61	
PS	Louis Mussington	1,107	16.73	
Independent	Jacques Hamlet	513	7.75	
Independent	Louis Jeffry	353	5.33	
FN	Nicole Thiébault	312	4.70	
EELV	Benoît Chauvin	0	0.00	
Turnout		6,837	30.08	

== Sources ==
- Official results of French elections: "Résultats électoraux officiels en France" (in French).
