= Rally Responsibility Success =

Rally Responsibility Success Rassemblement responsabilité réussite
- Leader: Alain Richardson

Rally Responsibility Success (French: Rassemblement responsabilité réussite) is a political party in Saint Martin, led by Alain Richardson. It won in the 1 July and 8 July 2007 Territorial Council elections 6 out of 23 seats.
