= Social-ecology =

French political movement

Social-ecology is a political movement that seeks to "link social and ecological issues". Theorized by Éloi Laurent, it has mainly been used in France by the Socialist Party (PS).

== Theorization ==
In his 2011 book of the same name, Éloi Laurent proposes through social-ecology "a green economic model to reduce inequalities and preserve and conserve natural resources (p. 209), in order to adapt the globalized capitalist system to the context of the ecological crisis ".

Scholar Michel Gueldry points out that social-ecology, represented by Éloi Laurent in France, is just one expression of "ecological thought", along with "simple living" (Pierre Rabhi), libertarian eco-communalism (Murray Bookchin), ecosocialism, political ecology ("in the sense of the vast leftist movement that emerged in the 1960s and 1970s, such as Hervé Kempf in France") and deep ecology.

== Usage in France ==
=== In the partisan field ===
In 1992, Ségolène Royal, Minister for the Environment in the Pierre Bérégovoy government, declared on the political program L'Heure de vérité: "If I wanted to sum it up in one word, I'm a social-ecologist", after specifying that, for her, "the environment is also a humanism" and that "what concerns me are inequalities in relation to the environment, and that's how I chose my priorities". For her, social justice and the environment are intimately linked.

At the 1992 Rio Summit, she defended environmental justice in north–south economic relations, attacking the United States of America in the process.

In 2003, Laurent Fabius, whose movement played "a decisive role in the evolution of the Socialist Party's ecological discourse" according to academic Timothée Duverger, argued "for a social-ecology", calling for ecology to become "central to the definition of the Socialist Party's policies".

In 2010, the SP placed the notion of social-ecology at the heart of its new project: in terms of ecology, it advocated "eco-conditionality of tax breaks for businesses and an eco-modulable VAT", as well as a "climate-energy contribution". Asked about this development in 2012, Jean-Luc Mélenchon, a proponent of ecosocialism, defined social-ecology as "ecology with a concern for the social. Or social with an ecological sensibility. It remains on the surface, without getting to the bottom of the system. Ecosocialism is socialism. It's the new definition of the socialist approach". During the 2012 presidential campaign, Aurélie Filippetti and several MPs and members of the Socialist Party's Ecological Pole put forward "François Hollande's social-ecology against the environmental liabilities of the Right".

As already hinted at in 2009, social-ecology became the SP slogan from the 2015 French departmental election campaign, under the impetus of First Secretary Jean-Christophe Cambadélis. The term became part of the party's logo later that year, along with a leaf; the move was seen as a handout from socialist leaders to voters and members of Europe Écologie Les Verts, then in the process of splitting. The Left Party denounced "a scandalous hold-up by the Socialist Party on eco-socialism", a term echoed in Jean-Christophe Cambadélis's motion: Cambadélis replied that "social-ecology has been defended by Laurent Fabius for 10 years now. Jean-Luc Mélenchon knew this, as he was once a member of this current within the Socialist Party". That same year, Marie-Noëlle Lienemann, a member of the SP national bureau, wondered about the alternative between social-ecology and ecosocialism, and felt that her party was "still groping about the concept. Each term has already been pre-empted by other political forces or associations". In the end, she chose the term ecosocialism.

Laurent Fabius and Jean-Marc Ayrault were leading figures in the social-ecology movement within the French Socialist Party (SP), before the latter made it a central notion of its project.

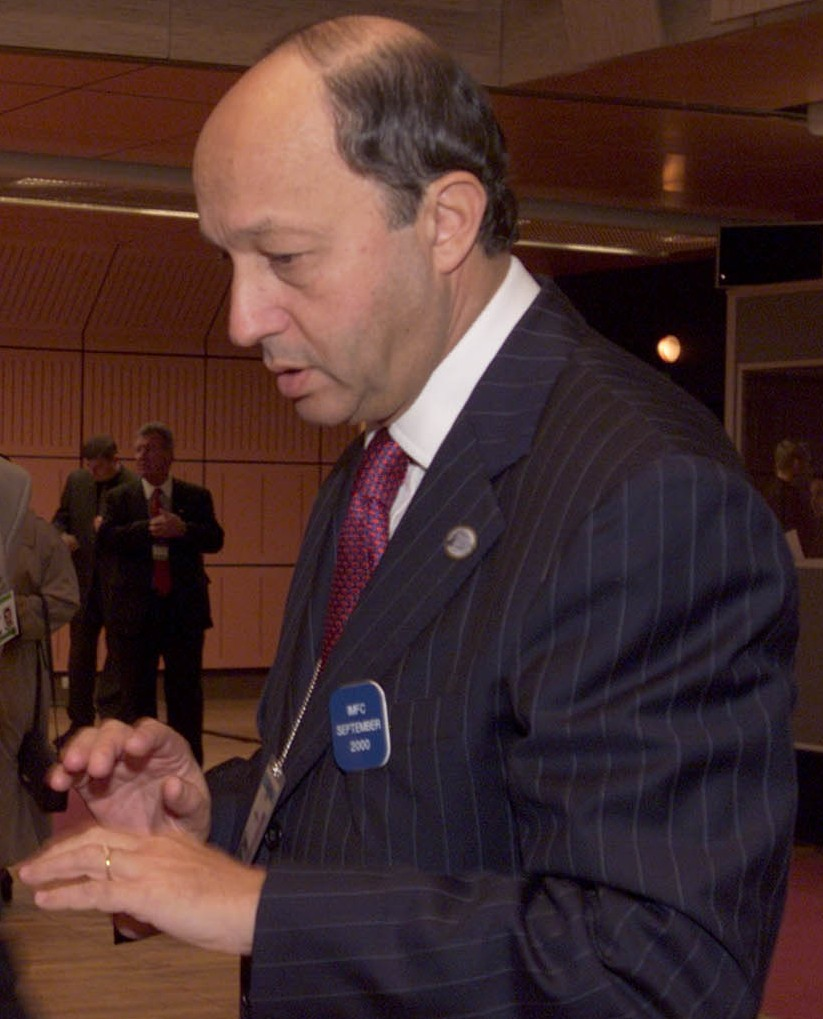

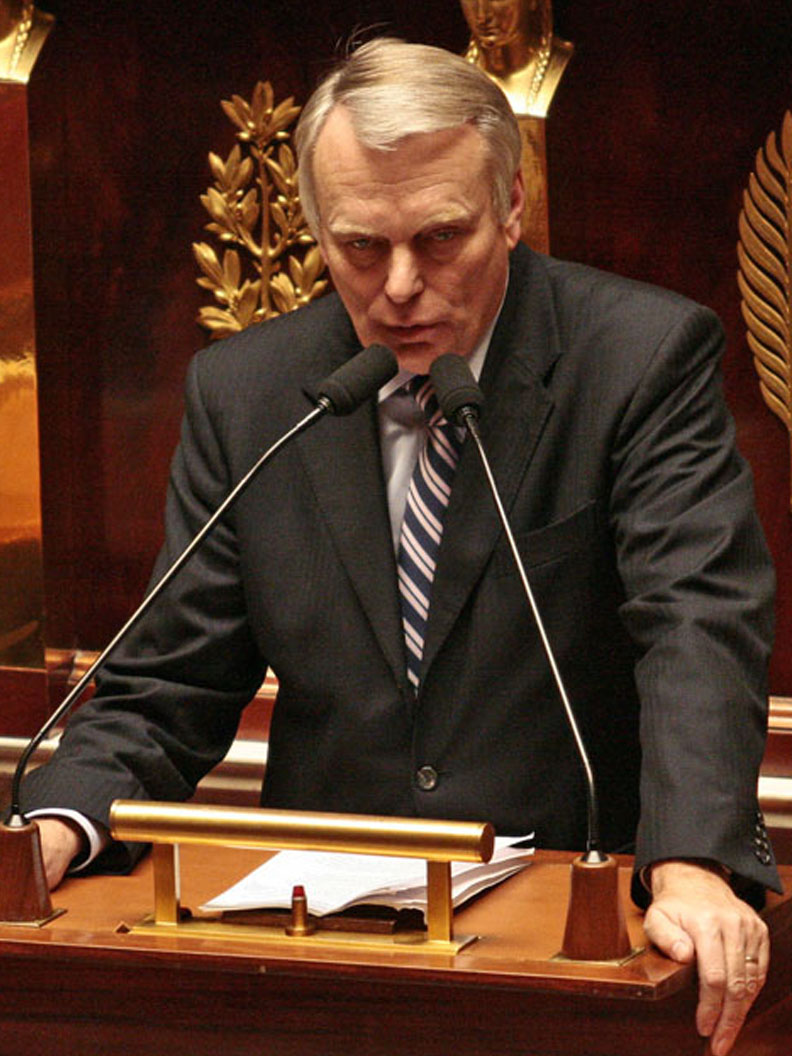

The program presented by Benoît Hamon during his campaign for the 2017 citizens' primary has been described as social-ecological, or ecosocialist. François de Rugy, president of the Ecologist Party and candidate in this same primary, also presented himself on that occasion as a supporter of social-ecology. During the 2017 presidential campaign, Éloi Laurent noted that "the social-ecological approach and the need for a social-ecological transition have progressed much further politically [than he could] have imagined six years ago, when [he] published Social-écologie. This can be seen, in particular, by consulting the programs of the two left-wing candidates in the presidential election" (Benoît Hamon and Jean-Luc Mélenchon). During the campaign for the 2017 legislative elections, twelve SP figures led by former ministers Najat Vallaud-Belkacem, Mathias Fekl and Estelle Grelier, called for "reinventing the left of tomorrow" by advocating a "reformist social-ecology".

During the campaign for the Aubervilliers congress (March 2018), Libération included social-ecology in the terms of "the hollow rhetoric" that contributed to the downfall of the SP, along with other expressions such as "vivre-ensemble" (living together), or "gauche de gouvernement" (government left). After his election, Olivier Faure continued to use the expression to evoke his party's orientation: "Our party has become 'social-ecologist' and we no longer delegate these issues to political partners". For the 2019 European elections, Le Parisien noted that within the SP, "social-ecology" was "gradually taking precedence over social-democracy", and that "under the influence of Place publique, the old party with the rose now advocated 'the meeting of social and ecology".

=== Social-ecology and the exercise of power ===
==== At the local level ====
The alliance between the SP and the ecologists in the Nantes region is seen as an example of the practical application of social-ecology, with several figures emerging under the aegis of Jean-Marc Ayrault (Ronan Dantec, Jean-Philippe Magnen and François de Rugy). Johanna Rolland, Jean-Marc Ayrault's successor as mayor of Nantes, also claimed to be a social-ecologist. This is also the case for Damien Carême, mayor of Grande-Synthe (SP then EELV).

==== On a national scale ====
In June 2012, after the SP came to power, Environment Minister Nicole Bricq organized an environmental conference for the following month, "on an equal footing with the social conference", advocating social-ecology as a method. In 2014, Cécile Duflot (Europe Écologie Les Verts) resigned from the government, saying it had favored "social orthodoxy" over social ecology:

"Choosing social-ecology means not just preserving an obsolete model, but preparing for a job-intensive future where we produce and consume differently."

— Lilian Allemagna, Laure Bretton, Cécile Duflot, Une décision douloureuse mais nécessaire, Libération

== See also ==
- Green economy
- Eco-socialism
- Political ecology

== Bibliography ==
- Laurent, Éloi (2011). Social-Écologie (in French). Flammarion. ISBN 978-2-08-126467-0.
- Laurent, Éloi (2015). "La social-écologie : une perspective théorique et empirique". Revue française des affaires sociales (in French) (1–2): 125–143. doi:10.3917/rfas.151.0125.
- Michel Bisson (2 June 2021). "Mettre en œuvre la social-écologie dans les territoires". jean-jaures.org (in French).
- Lejeune, C. (2012). Éloi Laurent, 2011, Social-Écologie, Paris, Flammarion, p. 226. Développement durable et territoires. Économie, géographie, politique, droit, sociologie, 3(1).
- Gueldry, M. (2013). Enjeux écologiques de la crise alimentaire.
- Duverger, T. (2011). Le Parti Socialiste et l’écologie. Paris: Jean Jaurés Fondation.
