= Union for Progress (Saint Martin) =

Political party in Saint Martin

The Union for Progress (Union pour le Progrès) is a political party in Saint Martin, led by Louis Constant-Fleming. It won in the 1 July and 8 July 2007 Territorial Council elections 16 out of 23 seats.
