= Daniel Gibbs =

French politician

The Honourable Daniel Gibbs
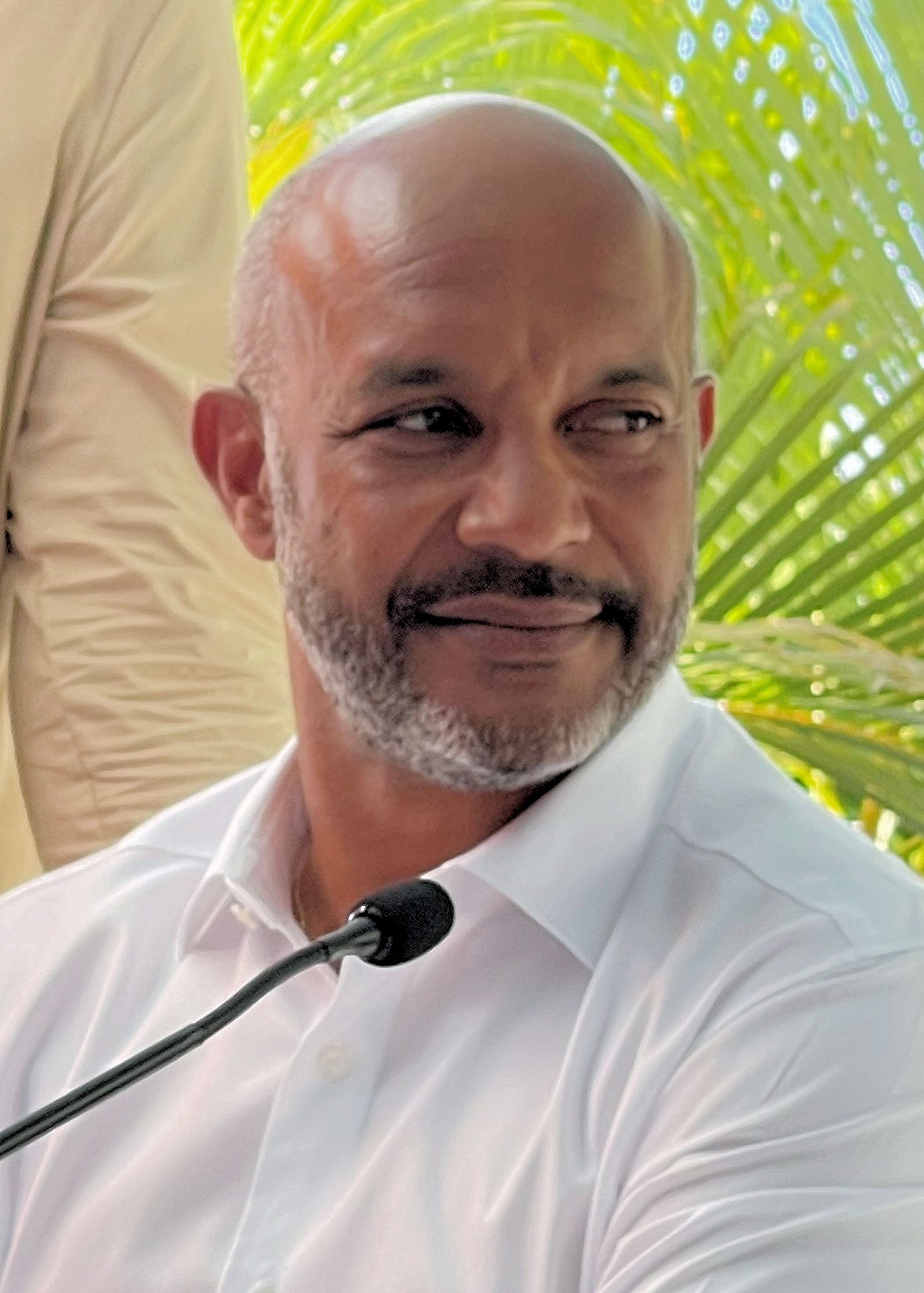
- Gibbs in March 2022

President of the Territorial Council of Saint Martin
- In office 2 April 2017 – 3 April 2022
- Preceded by: Aline Hanson
- Succeeded by: Louis Mussington

MP for Saint Barthélemy and Saint-Martin's 1st constituency
- In office 2012–2017
- Succeeded by: Claire Guion-Firmin

Personal details
- Party: Union for Democracy (Saint-Martin)

Daniel Gibbs (born 8 January 1968 in Saint-Martin) is a French Saint-Martinois politician.

== Political career ==
In 2011, he founded Union for Democracy.

He was elected MP to the French National Assembly on 17 June 2012 representing the constituency of Saint Barthélemy and Saint-Martin. In 2017, he succeeded Aline Hanson as President of the Overseas Collectivity of St. Martin.

In the 2022 Saint Martin Territorial Council election, he sought a second term in office but was defeated by Louis Mussington. He once again contested the constituency of Saint Barthélemy and Saint-Martin in the 2022 election but was defeated by LREM candidate Frantz Gumbs.
