= Saint-Martinois Rally =

Saint Martin political party

Saint-Martinois Rally Rassemblement saint-martinois (French)
- Abbreviation: RSM
- President: Louis Mussington
- Secretary: Lenny Mussington
- Vice president: Julien Gumbs
- Senate leader: Mathieu Darnaud
- Founders: Louis Mussington; Sujah Reiph; Alain Richardson
- Founded: 1996 (MAP); 2016 (MJP); 2021 (RSM)
- Ideology: Autonomism; Until 2021: Democratic socialism Separatism
- Political position: Historically: Left-wing
- National affiliation: Democrats
- Colours: Dark green
- Senate: 1 / 1 (Saint-Martin seats)
- Territorial Council of Saint-Martin: 16 / 23

The Saint-Martinois Rally (French: Rassemblement Saint-Martinois, RSM), formerly Movement for Justice and Prosperity (French: Mouvement pour la justice et la prospérité, MJP) from 2016 to 2021 and Movement for the Advancement of the People (French: Mouvement pour l'avancement du peuple, MAP) until 2016, is a Saint-Martinois political party, previously close to the Socialist Party until 2021 and now affiliated with the Democrats parliamentary group (part of the centrist Ensemble alliance).

== History ==
The party was created in 1996 by Louis Mussington, Alain Richardson and Sujah Reiph.

The party won the most seats in the 2022 Saint Martin Territorial Council election.

== See also ==
- List of political parties in the Collectivity of Saint Martin
