= Louis-Constant Fleming =

French politician

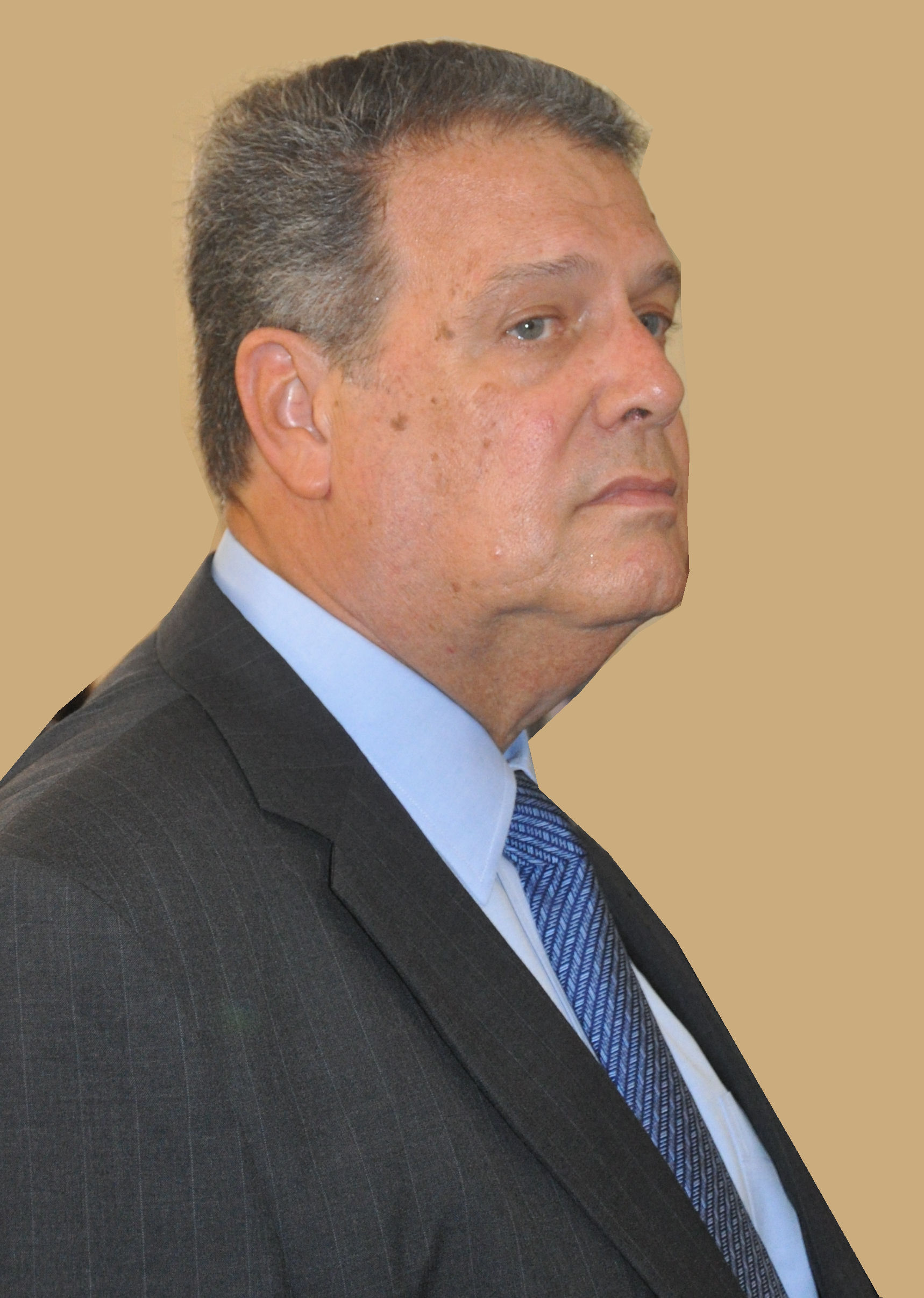
Fleming in 2013

Louis-Constant Fleming (born 1 December 1946) was a member of the Senate of France from 2008-2013, representing the island of Saint-Martin. He was born on the Dutch side of the island, Sint Maarten, where he attended primary school. He later left the island and went on to Canada. He has a degree in politics from a French university. He is a well known political figure in the French Caribbean, where he has held many positions. He is currently a member of the Union for a Popular Movement, and was the senator of Saint Martin. The only hospital in Saint Martin was named after him.

== Biography ==
He is the son of Louis-Constant Fleming (1898-1949), who was mayor of Saint-Martin from 1925 to 1949 and a member of the Departmental Council of Guadeloupe from 1946 to 1949, and Yvette Alexina Beauperthuy (1916-…). His grandfathers, Charles Daniel Beauperthuy and Louis Emmanuel Fleming, were successive mayors of Saint-Martin. His uncle, Hughes Élie Fleming, was mayor and Departmental Council of Guadeloupe of Saint-Martin from 1949 to 1959, then mayor from 1977 to 1983.

He completed his education: primary school in Sint Maarten, secondary school in Montreal (Canada), and university at the Faculty of Law in Montpellier (1968-1970).

Louis-Constant Fleming was deputy mayor of Collectivity of Saint Martin from 1977 to 1989, then city councilor (head of the Rassemblement des Saint-Martinois list) from 1989 to 1995, and again city councilor (head of the USM list) from 2001 to 2002.

He was a Regional Council of Guadeloupe from 1986 to 1992, then a general councilor for Guadeloupe from 1992 to 1998 and again from 2004 to 2007.

On July 15, 2007, he was elected as the first president of the Territorial Council of Saint Martin. He was declared ineligible for this position for one year and left office on July 25, 2008.

On September 21, 2008, he was elected senator of Collectivity of Saint Martin, by 17 votes out of 24 electors. Leader of the local Union for Progress party, he is a member of the Union for a Popular Movement parliamentary group in the Senate.

On September 14, 2010, he stepped down from the board of directors of the Société d’Économie Mixte de Saint-Martin (SEMSAMAR), of which he was a founding member in 1985 and the first president until 1989.

On December 27, 2013, Senator Fleming announced his resignation from his position as senator effective December 31, thereby retiring from political life. He justified his decision by citing both the health of his elderly mother, who lives far from Paris, and his disappointment with the outcome of the statutory reform of Saint Martin. However, several political observers believed that the real reason behind his resignation was the requirement for senators to publicly declare their entire assets, effective January 1, 2014 (the day after his resignation).

The next Senate elections were scheduled for September 2014 (i.e., less than a year later), in accordance with the law. Therefore, no by-election was held, and the seat remained vacant until the date of the Senate elections.

In January 2017, the High Authority for Transparency in Public Life (HATVP) announced that it had referred Louis-Constant Fleming's declaration of assets to the courts.

== Bibliography ==
- Page on the Senate website
