= Departmental Council of Guadeloupe =

Departmental legislature in France

The makeup of the council in 2015

The Departmental Council of Guadeloupe is the deliberative assembly of the French department of Guadeloupe. It is based at the Palace of the General Council.

Since 1 July 2021 its president is Guy Losbar, former mayor of Petit-Bourg.
