= Politics of the Collectivity of Saint Martin =

The Collectivity of Saint Martin was a French commune for many years and formed part of Guadeloupe, which is an overseas région and département of France and is therefore in the European Union. In 2003, the population of the French part of the island voted in favour of secession from Guadeloupe in order to form a separate overseas collectivity (COM) of France. On 9 February 2007, the French Parliament passed a bill granting COM status to both the French part of Saint Martin and neighbouring Saint Barthélemy. The new status took effect once the local assembly was elected on 15 February 2007. Saint Martin remains part of the European Union.

The new governance structure befitting an overseas collectivity took effect on 15 July 2007 with the first session of the Territorial Council (French: Conseil territorial) and the election of Louis-Constant Fleming as president of the Territorial Council. On 25 July 2008 Fleming resigned after being sanctioned by the Conseil d'État for one year over problems with his 2007 election campaign. On 7 August, Frantz Gumbs was elected as President of the Territorial Council. However, his election was declared invalid on 10 April 2009 and Daniel Gibbs appointed as Acting President of the Territorial Council on 14 April 2009. However, Gumbs was reelected on 5 May 2009.

There currently exists a movement in Saint Martin for achieving a political unification of the island.
