= List of oldest buildings in the Americas =

This article lists the oldest known surviving buildings constructed in America, including on each of the regions and within each country. "Building" is defined as any human-made structure used or interface for supporting or sheltering any use or continuous occupancy. In order to qualify for this list a structure must:

- be a recognisable building;
- incorporate features of building work from the claimed date to at least 1.5 metres (4.9 ft) in height;
- be largely complete or include building work to this height for most of its perimeter.
- contains an enclosed area with at least one entry point.

== Pre-Columbian era ==
Building	Image	Location	Country or territory	First built	Use	Notes
Sechin Bajo		Áncash	Peru	3500 BCE	Administrative-ceremonial center	A large archaeological site with ruins dating from 3500 BCE to 1300 BCE.
Pyramids of Caral		Lima	Peru	2600 BCE	Temples and houses	Built by the Caral civilization, these pyramids predate the Egyptian pyramids by around 100 years.
Los Naranjos		Yojoa	Honduras	800-400 BCE	Temples	Oldest man built structures still surviving in Honduras constructed by ancestors of the Lencan people.
Kotosh		Huánuco	Peru	1800 BCE	Temple	Archaeological site consisting of buildings with six periods of continuous occupation.
La Venta		Tabasco	Mexico	1700 BCE	Temples	Oldest structures in the state of Tabasco Mexico.
El Chircal		La Paz	Honduras	1400 BCE	Ceremonial center	Pyramids of the pre-Classic period built by the Lencan people.
Garagay		Lima	Peru	1400 BCE	Temples	One of the largest centers of pre-Columbian culture on Peru's central coast.
Yucuita		Oaxaca	Mexico	1300 BCE	Ceremonial center and a square	Founded by the Mixtec civilization in the pre-Classic Period
San José Mogote		Oaxaca	Mexico	1300 BCE	Town	San José Mogote was the largest and most important Zapotec settlement in the Valley of Oaxaca during the Early and Middle Formative periods.|
Chavín de Huantar		Áncash	Peru	1200 BCE	Religious center	Occupation at Chavín de Huántar by the Chavín people has been carbon dated to at least 3000 BCE.
Garðar Cathedral Ruins		Igaliku	Greenland	1126 CE	Cathedral	Oldest extant building of European origin in North America.
Hvalsey Church		Hvalsey	Greenland	1300 CE	Church	The best preserved Norse ruins in Greenland.

== 16th century ==
Building	Image	Location	Country or territory	First built	Use	Notes
Casa del Cordón		Santo Domingo	Dominican Republic	1502–1503	Isabelline Gothic house	Oldest European stone house in America and probably the first European two-story house.
Fortaleza Ozama		Santo Domingo	Dominican Republic	1502–1508	Fortification	Oldest military construction of European origin in America.
Hospital San Nicolás de Bari		Santo Domingo	Dominican Republic	1503	Hospital	Oldest hospital in America. In ruins.
Monasterio de San Francisco		Santo Domingo	Dominican Republic	1509–1560	Monastery	Oldest monastery in America.
Church and Convent of los Dominicos		Santo Domingo	Dominican Republic	1510-1532	Convent and University	Oldest Catholic building in continuous use in the Americas, and also, it was the headquarters of the first university in the Americas.
Alcázar de Colón		Santo Domingo	Dominican Republic	1511–1514	Palace	Oldest European official residence in the Americas.
Basilica Cathedral of Santa María la Menor		Santo Domingo	Dominican Republic	1514–1541	Cathedral	First and oldest cathedral in the Americas, excluding Greenland.
Casa de Diego Velázquez		Santiago de Cuba	Cuba	1516–1530	Official residence	Oldest extant building in Cuba. Built as a fortified residence for Diego Velázquez.
Cathedral of San Juan		San Juan, Puerto Rico	Puerto Rico	1521–1577	Cathedral	Oldest extant cathedral in Puerto Rico and the United States. The original wood foundations date back to 1521.
Casa Blanca		San Juan	Puerto Rico	1523–1525	Official residence	Oldest extant building in Puerto Rico. Built as a fortified residence for Juan Ponce de León.
Convento de los Dominicos		San Juan	Puerto Rico	1523–1529	Convent	Oldest convent in Puerto Rico and the United States.
Palace of Cortés		Cuernavaca	Mexico	1531–1535	Palace	Oldest extant civil structure in the continental Americas.
Church of San José		San Juan	Puerto Rico	1532–1735	Church	Oldest standing church building in Puerto Rico and the United States.
La Fortaleza		San Juan	Puerto Rico	1533–1540	Official residence	Oldest official residence in continuous use in the Americas.
Iglesia de Balbanera		Cajabamba	Ecuador	1534	Church	Oldest extant building in Ecuador.
Iglesia de La Merced		Granada	Nicaragua	1534	Church	Oldest extant building in Nicaragua.
Church of Saints Cosme and Damião		Igarassu	Brazil	1535	Church	Oldest extant building in Brazil.
Cathedral Basilica of Lima		Lima	Peru	1535–1649	Cathedral	Oldest extant building in Peru.
Colegio de Santa Cruz de Tlatelolco		Mexico City	Mexico	1536	College	First and oldest European school of higher learning in the Americas. First major school of interpreters and translators in the Americas.
Castillo San Felipe del Morro		San Juan, Puerto Rico	Puerto Rico	1539–1650	Fortification	Oldest extant masonry fortification construction in Puerto Rico and the United States.
Monasterio de Santo Domingo		Guatemala City	Guatemala	1544–1551	Monastery	Oldest extant building in Guatemala. In ruins.
Real Audiencia de los Confines		Gracias	Honduras	1544	Government building	Oldest administrative building extant in Honduras.
Santa Barbara Fortress		Trujillo	Honduras	1550–1553	Fortification	Oldest military construction of European origin on the American mainland.
Iglesia de San Francisco		Bogotá	Colombia	1557–1566	Church	Oldest extant building in Colombia.
Castle de la Real Fuerza		Havana	Cuba	1558–1577	Fortification	It is considered to be the oldest stone fort in the Americas.
Metropolitan Cathedral of Sucre		Sucre	Bolivia	1559–1712	Cathedral	Oldest extant building in Bolivia.
La Merced Church		Comayagua	Honduras	1550–1561	Church	Oldest church still standing in Honduras
Immaculate Conception Cathedral		Comayagua	Honduras	1563–1715	Cathedral	Oldest cathedral still standing in Honduras.
Iglesia de Nuestra Señora de la Asunción		Izalco	El Salvador	1569	Church	Oldest extant building in El Salvador. In ruins.
Basilica of the Virgin of Monserrat		Hormigueros	Puerto Rico	1570s	Church	Church structure has existed on the same location since the mid 16th century. Radiocarbon dating on the building foundations and the inner chapel dates to ca. 1570. The current church building was built during the second half of the 18th century.
Iglesia de Nuestra Señora de la Limpia Concepción		Ujarrás	Costa Rica	1580s	Church	Oldest extant building in Costa Rica. Partially restored.

== 17th century ==
Building	Image	Location	Country or territory	First built	Use	Notes
Palace of the Governors		Santa Fe	United States	1610–1618	Palace	Oldest extant building in the contiguous United States.
King's Castle		St. George's Parish	Bermuda	1612	Fortification	Ruined King's Castle ("Queen's Castle" during the reigns of Queens Anne and Victoria, and also called "Seaward Fort") on Castle Island (including its Captain's house, the oldest surviving dwelling house in Bermuda). Oldest extant building in Bermuda.
Iglesia de San Francisco		Santiago	Chile	1618	Church	Oldest extant building in Chile.
State House		St. George's Town	Bermuda	1620	House of Assembly	The State House was the first purpose-built home of the House of Assembly, which then constituted the only chamber of the Parliament of Bermuda. Other than fortifications, it was Bermuda's first stone building. It is the oldest surviving Bermudian building, again excepting some fortifications (St. Peter's Church was established in 1612, but rebuilt several times and its oldest parts are thought to date from the 1620s), and has been used since 1815 as a Masonic lodge.
St. Peter's Church		St. George's Town	Bermuda	1620s (established 1612)	Church	Oldest Protestant church in the "New World" (the Americas and certain Atlantic islands such as Bermuda). St. Peter's Church was the first of nine Parish churches established in Bermuda by the Church of England. It was originally built in 1612, but rebuilt several times and its oldest parts today are thought to date from the 1620s. The House of Assembly of Bermuda met in the church pending completion of the State House.
Carr's Bay Gun Battery		Little Bay	Montserrat	1624	Fortification	Oldest extant building in Montserrat.
Fort Amsterdam		Philipsburg	Sint Maarten	1631	Fortification	Oldest extant building in Sint Maarten and on the island of Saint Martin.
Fort Amsterdam		Willemstad	Curaçao	1634	Fortification	Oldest extant building in Curaçao. Founded by the Dutch West India Company.
Fort Oranje		Kralendijk	Bonaire	1639	Fortification	Oldest extant building in Bonaire.
Latouche House		Le Carbet	Martinique	c. 1640	Residence	Oldest building in Martinique. In ruins. Located within the Martinique Zoo.
Ursulines of Quebec		Quebec City, Quebec	Canada	1641–1642	Monastery	Oldest extant building in Canada. Oldest institution of learning for women in North America.
St. Thomas' Lowland Church		Saint Thomas Lowland Parish	Saint Kitts and Nevis	1643	Church	Oldest extant building in Saint Kitts and Nevis.
Biblioteca Palafoxiana		Puebla City	Mexico	1646–1773	Library	First and oldest public library in the Americas.
Drax Hall		Saint George	Barbados	1650s	Residence	Possibly the oldest extant building in Barbados.
Fort Zeelandia		Paramaribo	Suriname	1651	Fortification	Oldest extant building in Suriname.
St Nicholas Abbey		Saint Peter	Barbados	1658	Residence	Oldest extant building in Barbados with a verifiable date of construction.
Fort Morgan Cay		Roatán	Honduras	1667	Fortification	Oldest building of european origin in the Bay Islands in ruins.
Fort Christian		Charlotte Amelie	U.S. Virgin Islands	1672–1680	Fortification	Oldest extant building in the United States Virgin Islands.
Castillo de San Marcos		St. Augustine, Florida	United States	1672–1695	Fortification	Oldest extant masonry fortification in the contiguous United States.
White Horse Tavern		Newport, Rhode Island	United States	1673	Tavern	Oldest extant tavern in the Americas.
Iglesia de la Merced		Panama City	Panama	1680	Church	Oldest extant building in Panama.
Halse Hall		Clarendon Parish	Jamaica	1680	Residence	Oldest extant building in Jamaica.
St. Ignatius Church		Buenos Aires	Argentina	1686-1722	Church	Oldest extant building in Argentina.

== 18th century ==
Building	Image	Location	Country or territory	First built	Use	Notes
Grenada National Museum		St. George's	Grenada	1704	Fortification	Oldest extant building in Grenada. Served as a French barracks, British women's prison, hotel, warehouse, and is currently a museum.
Mount Carmel House		Saint-Claude	Guadeloupe	1726	Residence	Oldest extant building in Guadeloupe.
Mikvé Israel-Emanuel Synagogue		Willemstad	Curaçao	1730	Synagogue	Oldest extant synagogue in the Americas.
Fort Saint-Joseph		Fort-Liberté	Haiti	1735–1743	Fortification	Oldest extant building in Haiti.
Fort Montagu		Nassau	Bahamas	1741–1742	Fortification	Oldest extant building in the Bahamas.
Fort Zeelandia		Essequibo Islands-West Demerara	Guyana	1743	Fortification	Oldest extant building in Guyana. In ruins. Fort Kyk-Over-Al is older (built in 1616) but no longer fits the definition of a building.
Ursuline Convent		New Orleans, Louisiana	United States	1748-1752	Convent	Oldest extant building in New Orleans and the southern Mississippi valley.
French Guiana Prefecture Building		Cayenne	French Guiana	1749–1752	Monastery	Oldest extant building in French Guiana. Currently serves as the seat of the Prefect of French Guiana.
Court House		St. John's	Antigua and Barbuda	1750	Courthouse	Oldest extant building in Antigua and Barbuda.
Viola House		Asunción	Paraguay	1750–1758	Residence	Oldest extant building in Paraguay.
Sambro Island Light		Sambro Island, Nova Scotia	Canada	1758	Lighthouse	Oldest extant lighthouse in the Americas.
Fort James		Plymouth	Trinidad and Tobago	1762	Fortification	Oldest extant building in Trinidad and Tobago.
Sandy Hook Light		Sandy Hook, New Jersey	United States	1764	Lighthouse	Oldest extant lighthouse in the United States.
Fort Young		Roseau	Dominica	1770	Fortification	Oldest extant building in Dominica. Partially converted to a hotel in 1964.
Fort Rodney		Pigeon Island	Saint Lucia	1779–1782	Fortification	Oldest extant building in Saint Lucia.
Pedro St. James Castle		Grand Cayman	Cayman Islands	1780	Residence	Oldest extant building in the Cayman Islands. Restored in 1996.
Governors' House		Gustavia	Saint Barthélemy	1780	Residence	Oldest extant building in Saint Barthélemy. Originally a private residence, it became the Governors' House of Saint Barthélemy in 1785.
Wallblake House		The Valley	Anguilla	1787	Residence	Oldest extant building in Anguilla.
Fort Louis		Marigot	Saint Martin	1789	Fortification	Oldest extant building in Saint Martin.
Wade's Green Plantation		North Caicos	Turks and Caicos Islands	1789	Residence	Oldest extant building on the Turks and Caicos Islands. In ruins.
Montevideo Metropolitan Cathedral		Montevideo	Uruguay	1790–1804	Cathedral	Oldest extant building in Uruguay.
Fort Zoutman		Oranjestad	Aruba	1796–1798	Fortification	Oldest extant building in Aruba. Founded by the Dutch West India Company.
House of Assembly		Kingstown	Saint Vincent and the Grenadines	1798	Parliament	Oldest extant building in Saint Vincent and the Grenadines.

== 19th century ==
Building	Image	Location	Country or territory	First built	Use	Notes
Russian-American Magazin		Kodiak	United States	1805–1808	General store	Oldest extant building of Russian origin in the Americas.
St. John's Cathedral		Belize City	Belize	1812–1820	Cathedral	Oldest extant building in Belize.
Central Stores		Stanley	Falkland Islands	1844	General store	Oldest extant building in the Falkland Islands.
Our Lady of Ardilliers Church		Miquelon-Langlade	Saint Pierre and Miquelon	1862–1865	Church	Oldest extant building in Saint Pierre and Miquelon.

== See also ==
- San Basilio de Palenque, according to UNESCO it was the first free African town in the Americas, located 50 kilometres (31 mi) from Cartagena de Indias, Colombia.
- List of the oldest buildings in the United States
- List of oldest known surviving buildings
