= Hospital San Nicolás de Bari =

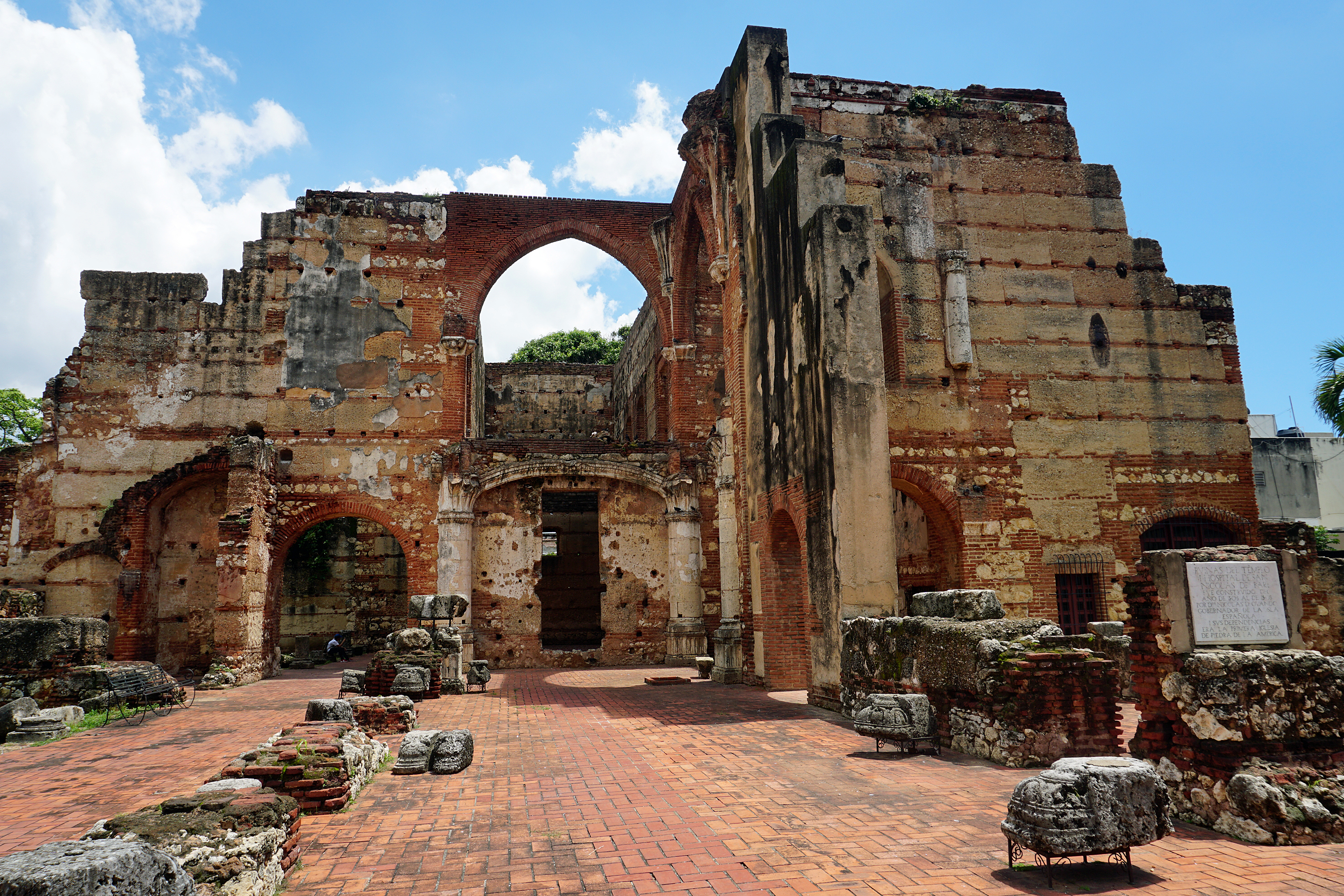
- Hospital San Nicolás de Bari

Geography
- Location: Santo Domingo, Dominican Republic
- Coordinates: 18.47502°N 69.88524°W

Organisation
- Type: General
- Religious affiliation: Catholic Church

Services
- Beds: 70

History
- Constructed: 1503
- Opened: 1522
- Closed: mid-18th century

The Hospital San Nicolás de Bari is a preserved hospital ruin, and it was recognized by UNESCO for being the oldest hospital built in the Americas. Construction began in 1503 in Santo Domingo, Dominican Republic, at the behest of governor (and namesake of the hospital) Nicolás de Ovando. This grand project was in keeping with the desire to emulate European princely courts, and looked to Renaissance Italy for inspiration. At the time of its completion, the wards could accommodate up to 70 patients, comparable to the most advanced churches of Rome. It is likely that the model for the Hospital de San Nicolás was the large Ospedale di Santo Spirito in Sassia in Rome. The complex forms part of the Colonial Zone of Santo Domingo World Heritage Site.

== History ==
The hospital began operating in 1522 and provided its services until the mid-18th century.

The complex occupied most of the block and was built on two stories in a cross shaped plan. Each of the corners contained a courtyard that provided light, ventilation, and open space to the various hospital facilities. The structure, in keeping with contemporary European hospitals, was composed of three naves: a central one for worship flanked by two lateral naves which housed the sick. In this way, patients were literally steps away from the sanctuary and the chapel located in its core. There was also a separate private chapel, now incorporated into the adjacent 20th Century Nuestra Señora de la Altagracia church. This despite the hospital having been undertaken by an association of benefactors rather than by a monastic order.

Already a ruin in 1908 when part of its façade collapsed, the hospital exhibited a combination of Gothic and Renaissance elements, with some considerable Mudéjar influence, as was typical of 16th Century Santo Domingo buildings. For example, the interior arches—which supported Gothic rib vaults—were pointed on the second story yet barreled on the ground floor. The vanguardist plan of the San Nicolás de Bari hospital served as a model for other hospitals throughout Spanish America, namely the Hospital de la Concepción undertaken in Mexico by Hernando Cortés in 1524.

In recognition of the primacy in the Americas represented by the Hospital San Nicolás de Bari, on January 28, 2021 with the interest of strengthening the historical and cultural aspects associated with the rich history of medicine represented in the Dominican Republic, the Standing Committee on Cultural Center and Pan American Museum of Medical Sciences (MPCM) is formed, a project led by the National University Pedro Henríquez Ureña and the office of the Mayor of Santo Domingo. The project seeks to create interdisciplinary Pan-American synergies that promote the development of this important cultural-historical project, thus developing a permanent museum in the spaces associated with the Ruins of the Nicolás de Bari Hospital, and from there promoting permanent and temporary exhibitions and cultural exchanges that make up the Americas. The provisional secretariat is in charge of the staff at the Center for High Humanistic and Spanish Language Studies, attached to UNPHU, which operates in the historic House of the Jesuits, former headquarters of the Pontifical University of Santiago de la Paz and Gorgón. Doctor Amado Alejandro Báez was appointed as coordinator and Mr. Yovanny Céspedes as file manager and secretariat

== See also ==
- List of oldest buildings in the Americas
- Some of the other historical sites from the Colonial Era in Santo Domingo's Ciudad Colonial:
  - Fortaleza Ozama (built in 1502)
  - Basilica Cathedral of Santa María la Menor (construction began in 1512)
  - Autonomous University of Santo Domingo (seminary established in 1538)
  - Monasterio de San Francisco (built between 1509 and 1560)

== Gallery ==
Images of the ruins
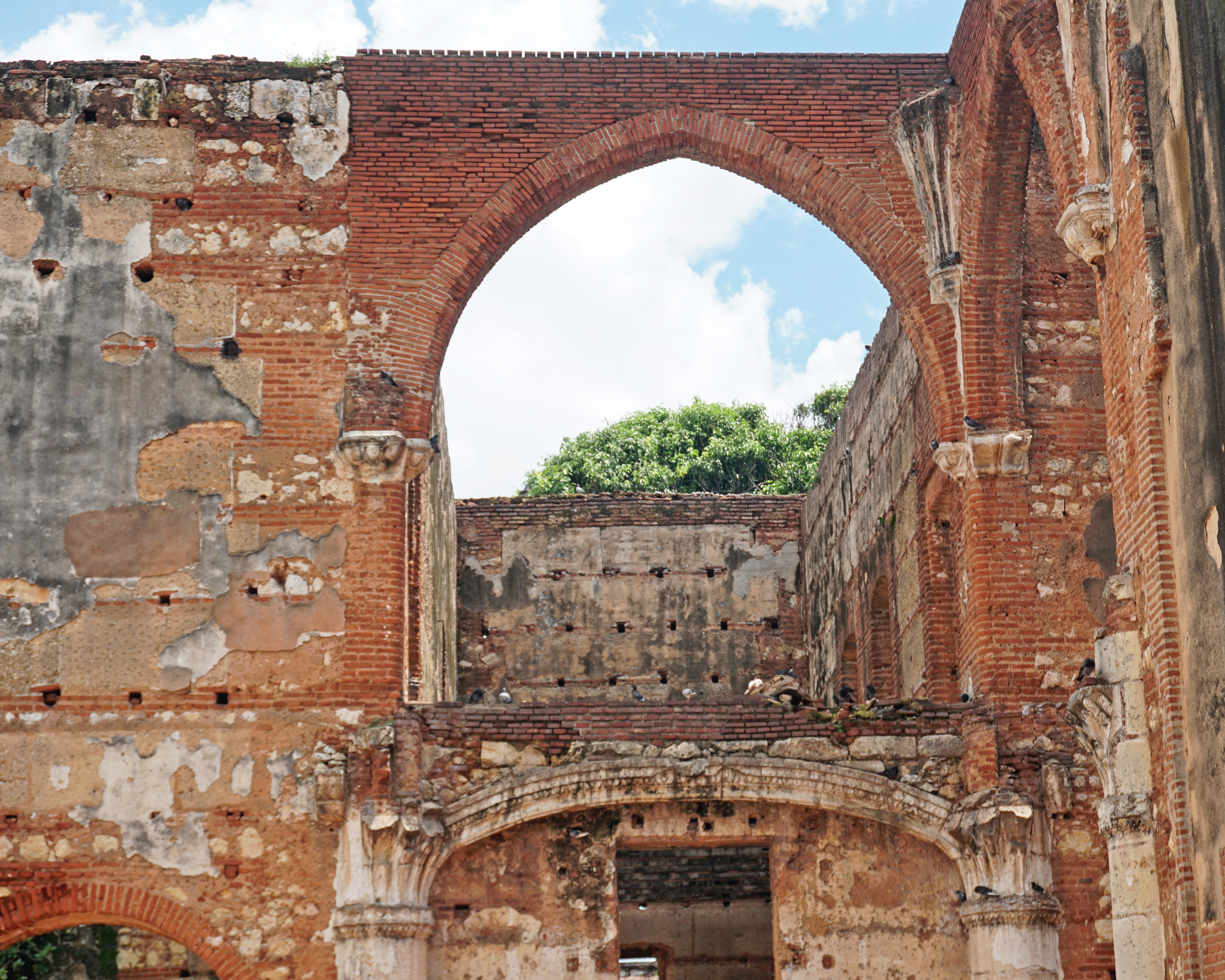

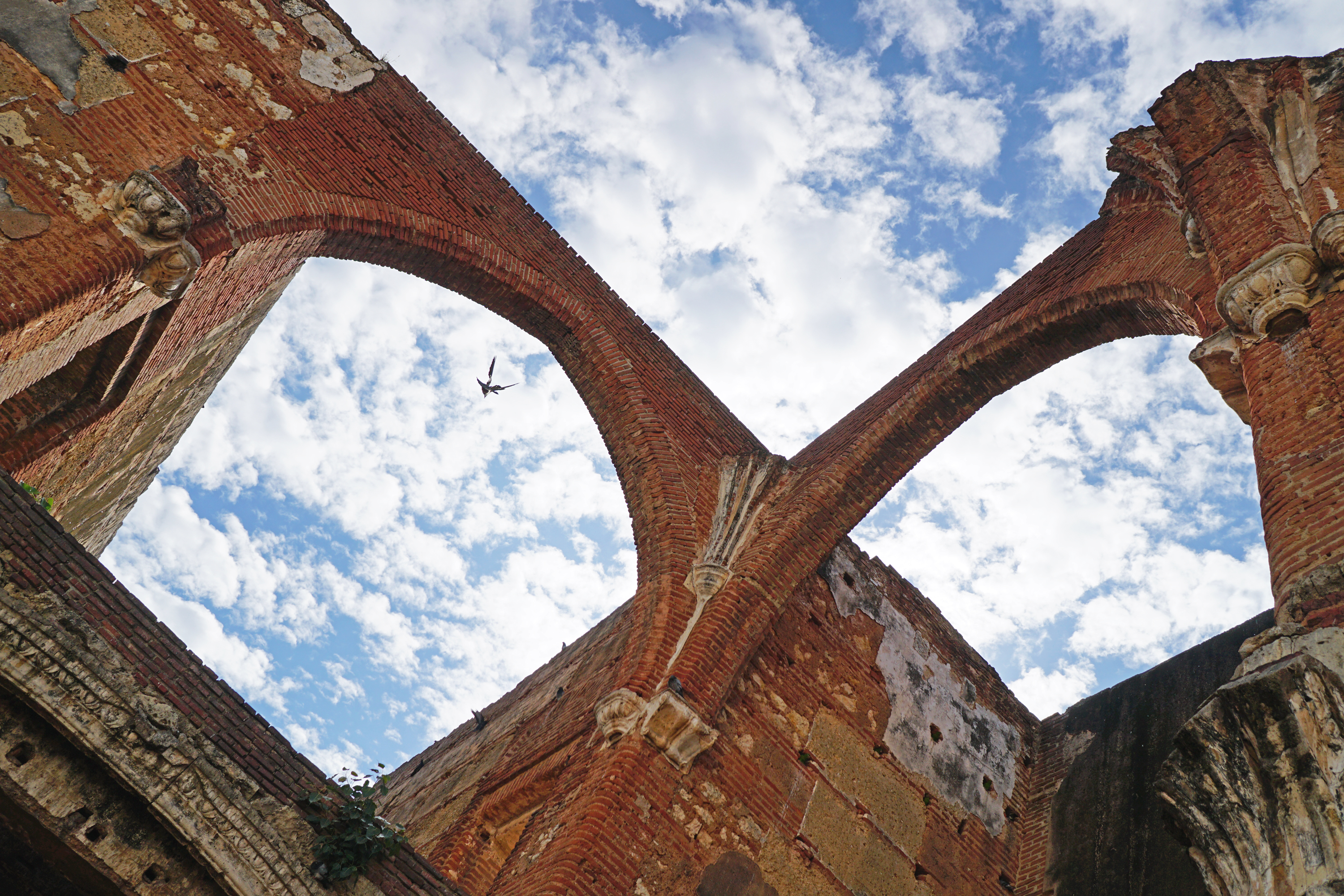

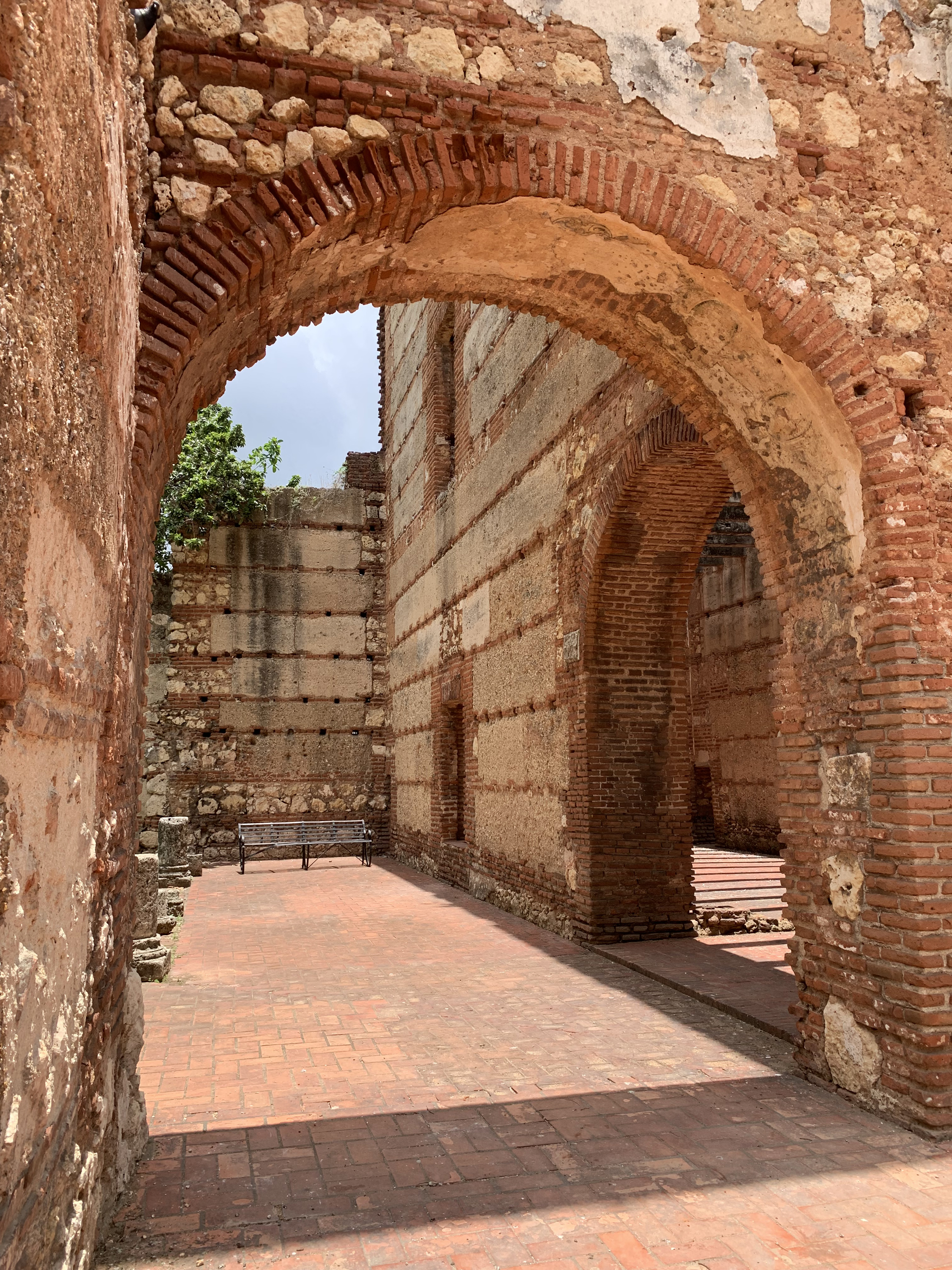

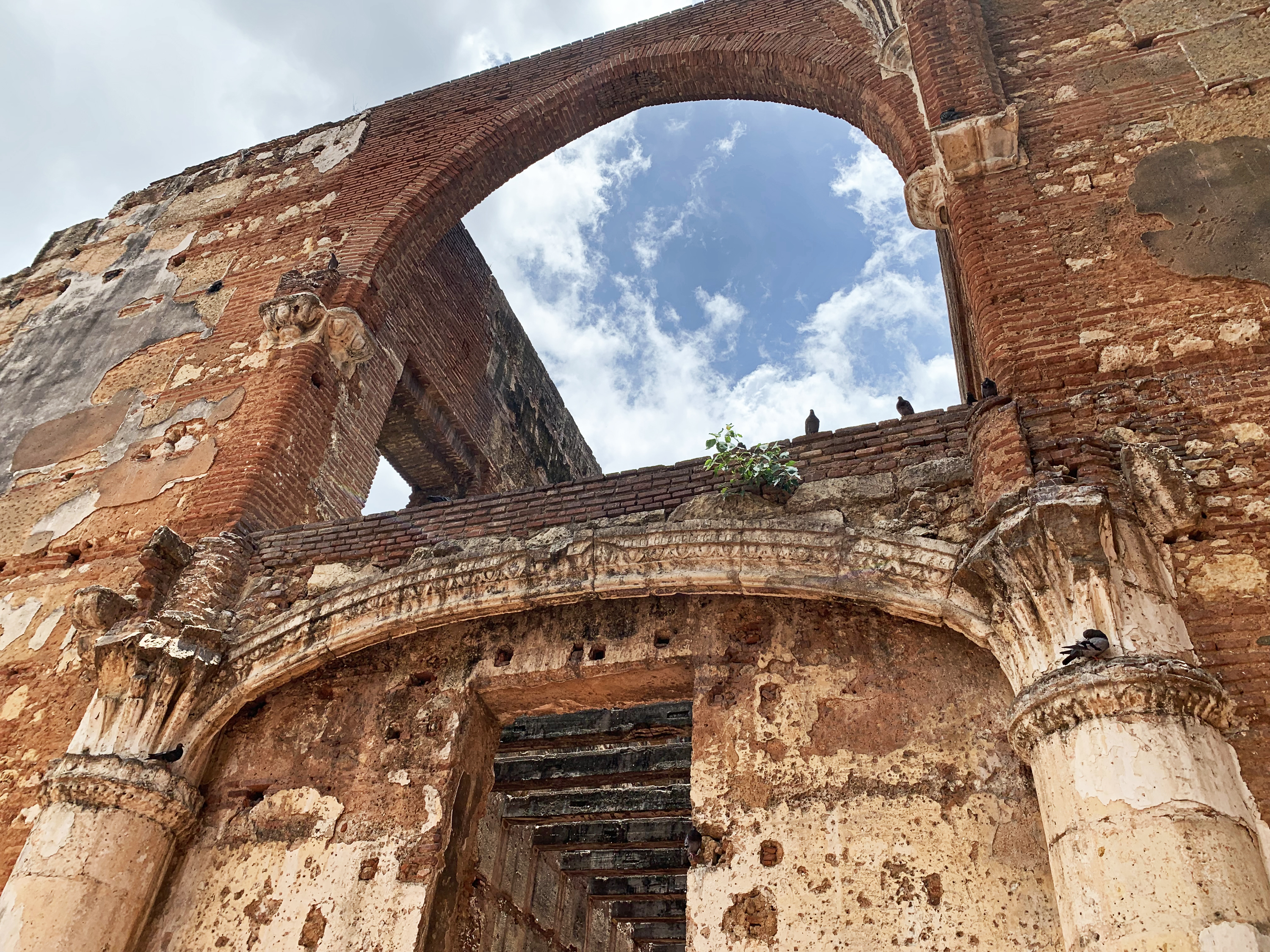

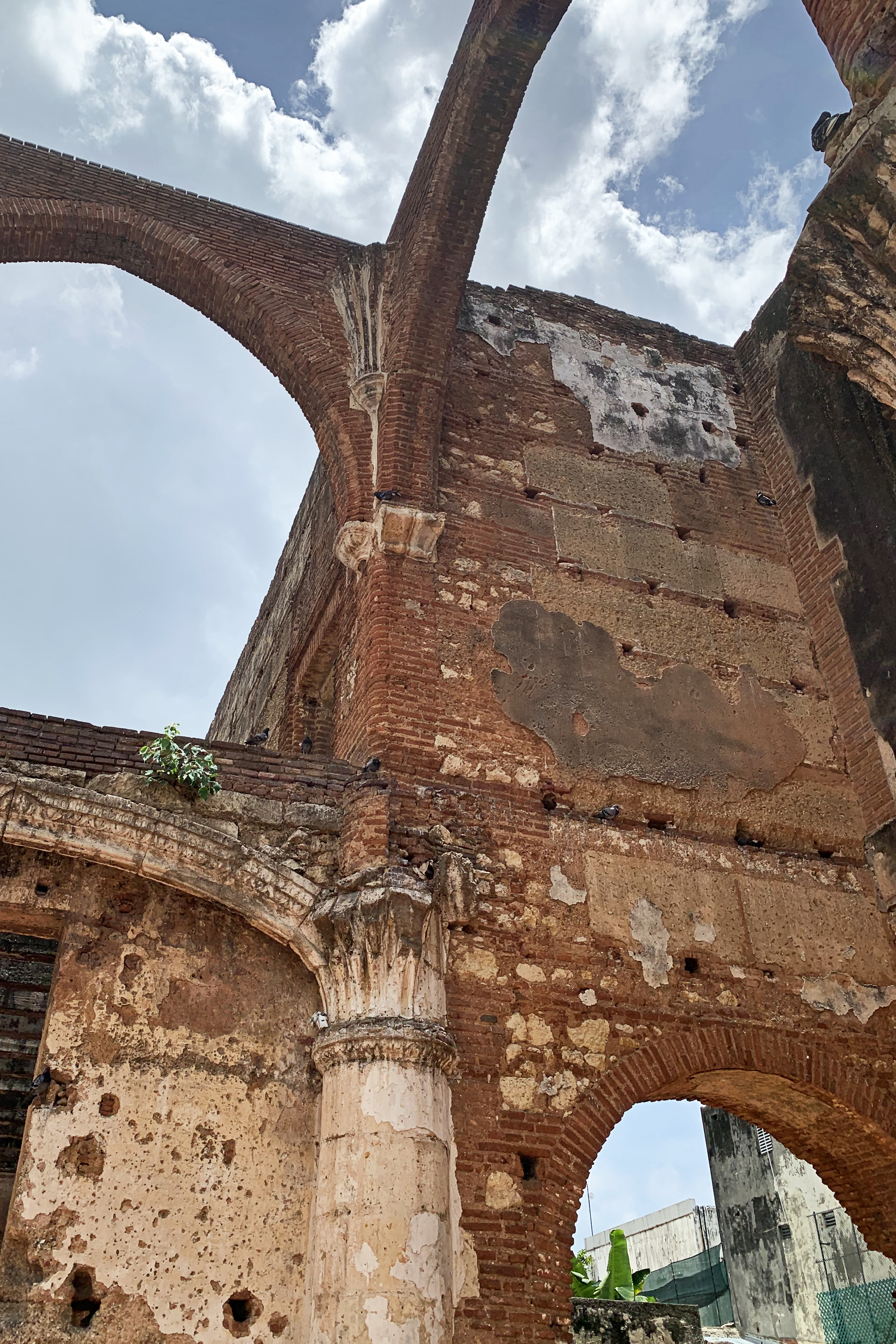

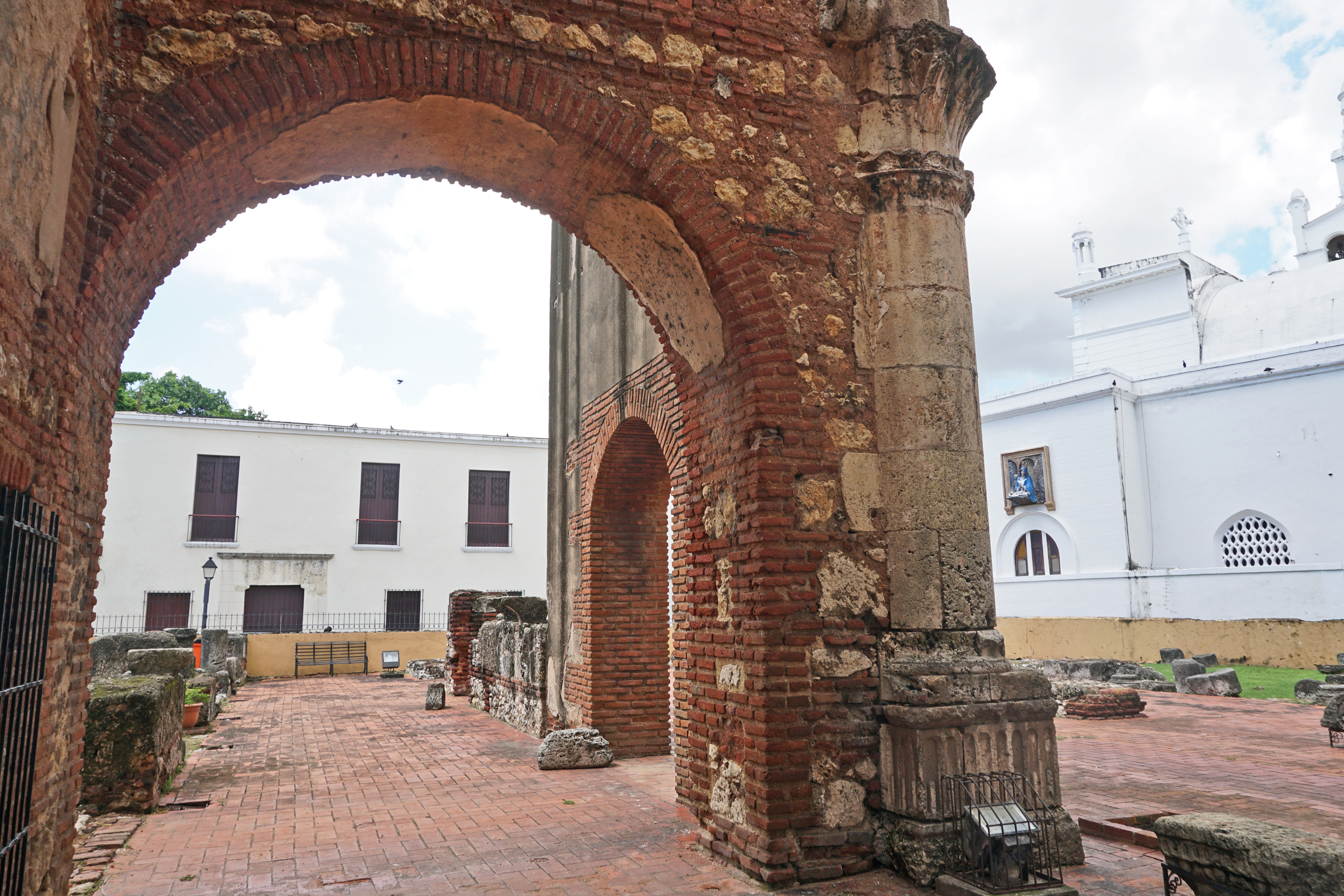

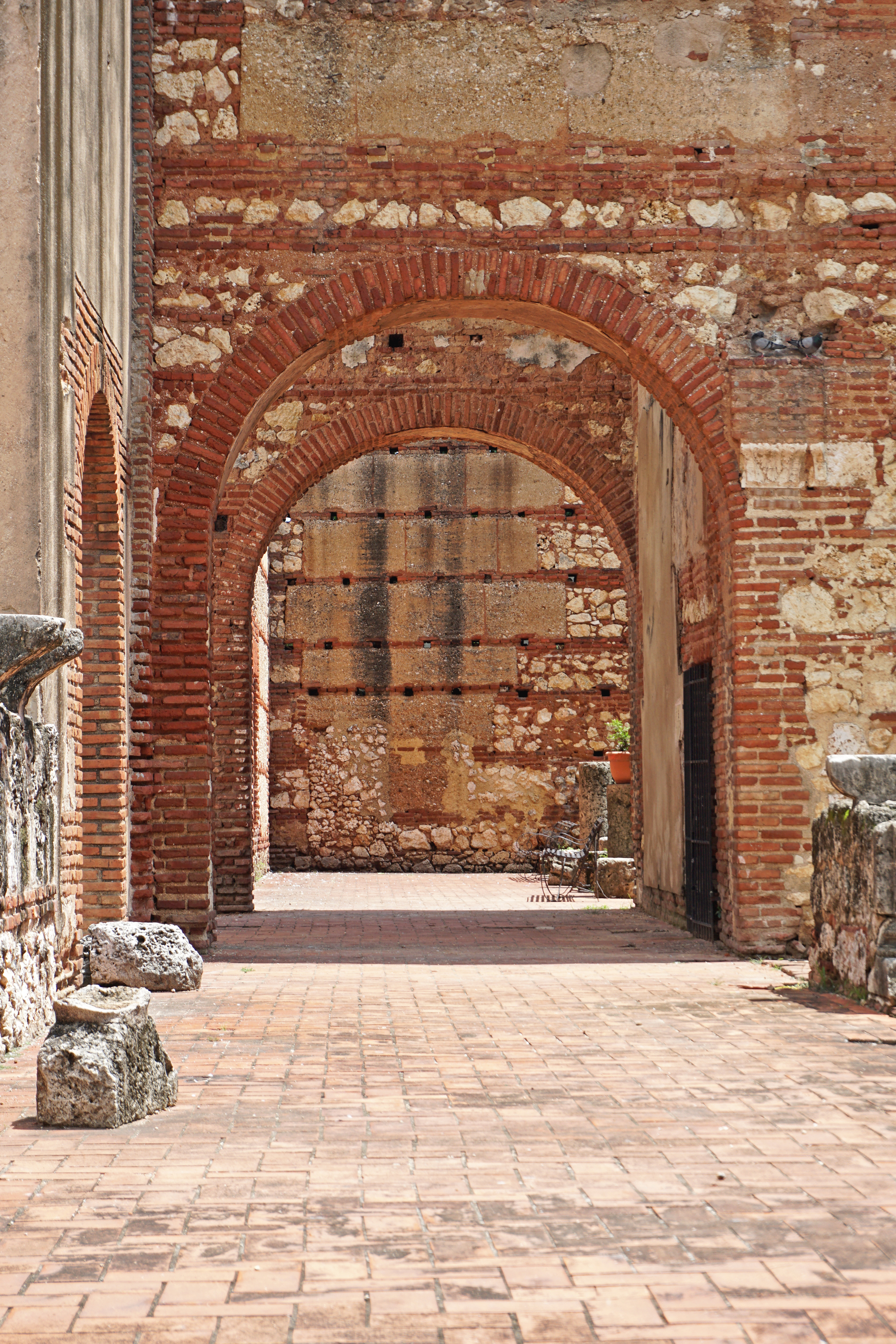

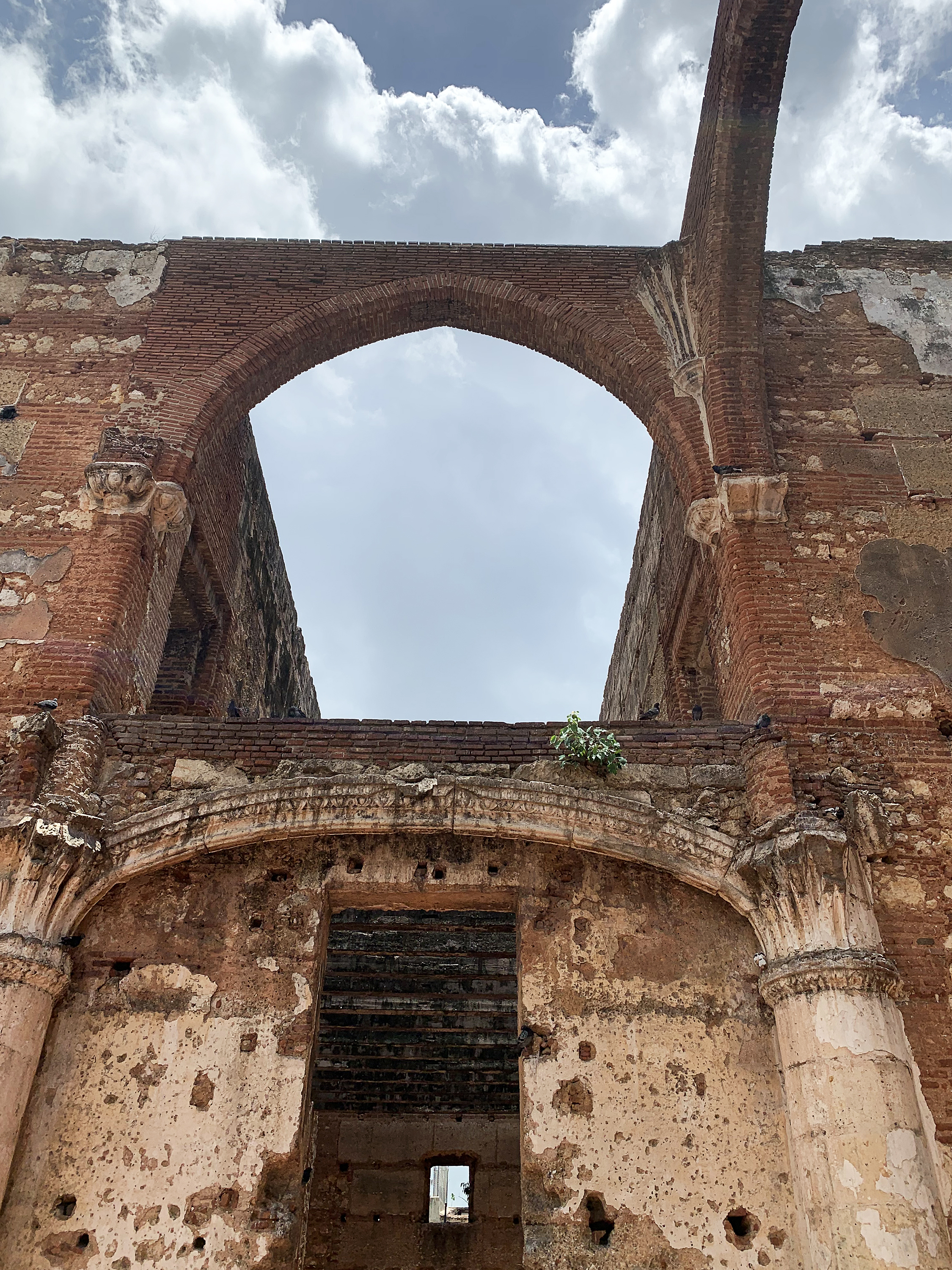
