= Fort Amsterdam (Sint Maarten) =

17th century Dutch fort near Philipsburg, Sint Maarten

Coordinates: 18.0146°N 63.0597°W

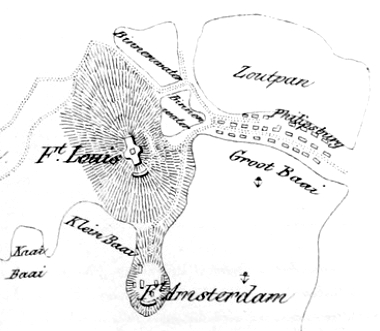
Map of Philipsburg (1850)

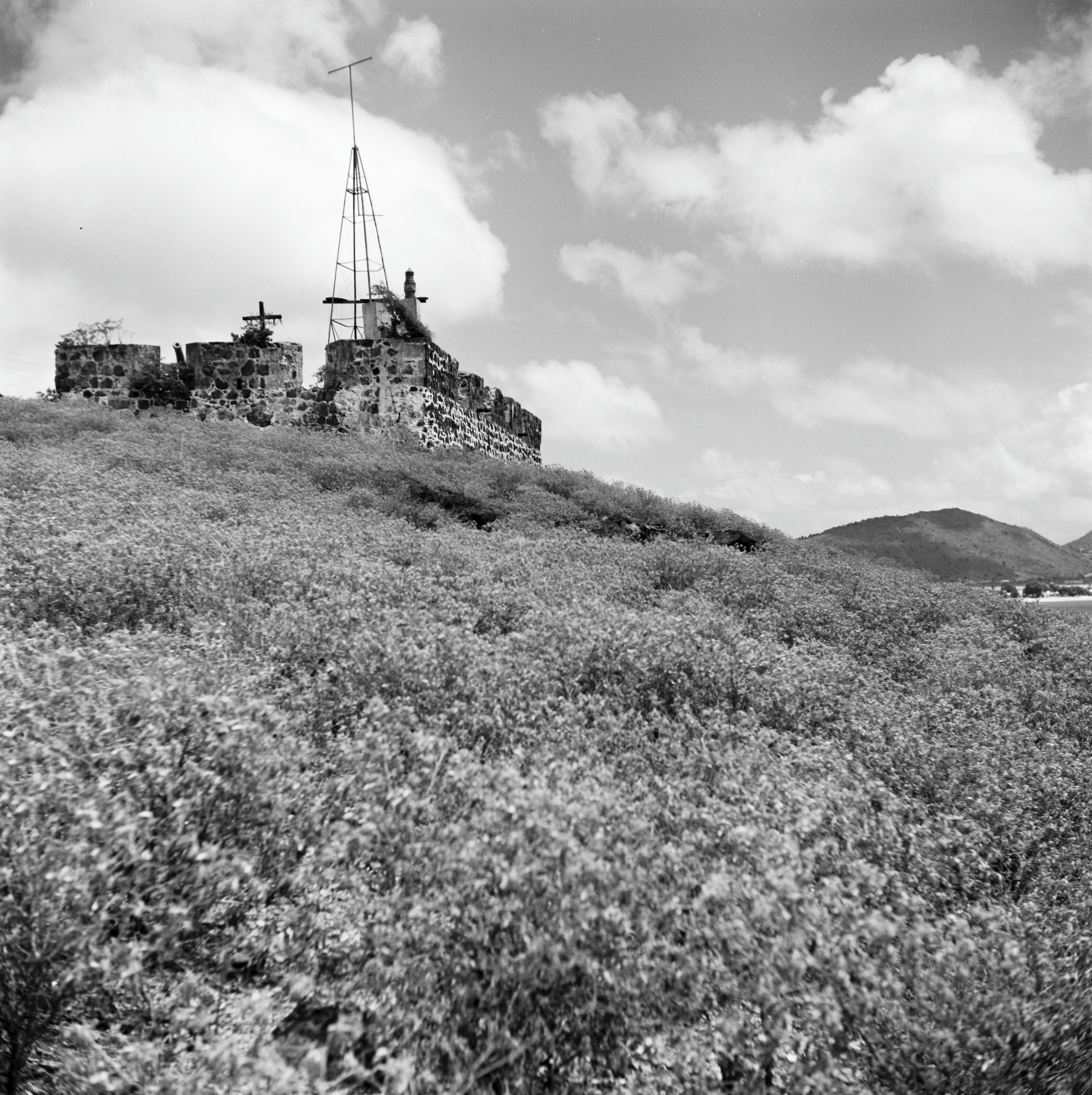
The fort in 1966

Fort Amsterdam is a historic fortress on the island of Saint Martin, near the Sint Maarten town of Philipsburg.

== History ==
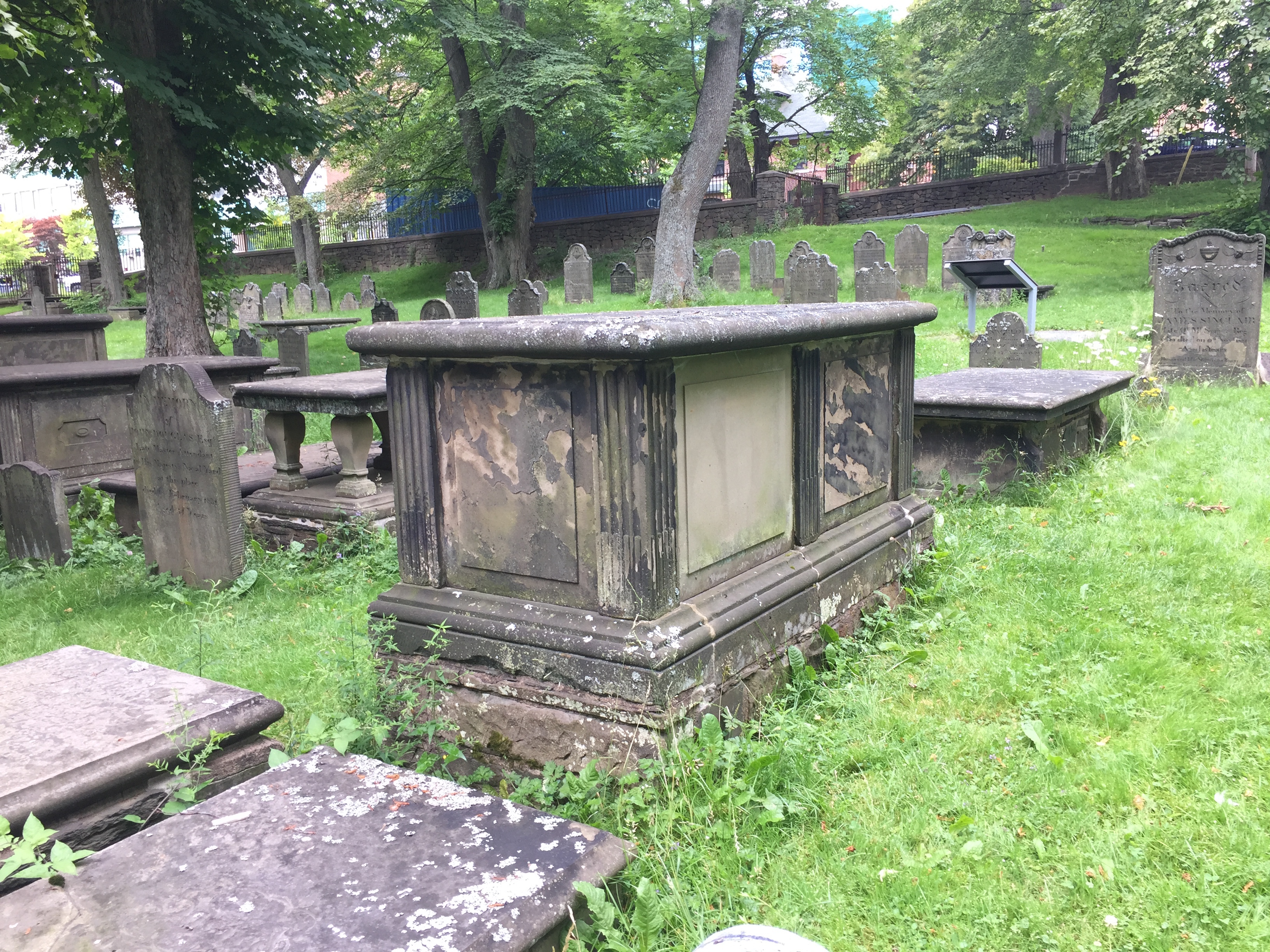
Major Thomas Huxley, a leader of the British siege of Fort (1800) Old Burying Ground (Halifax, Nova Scotia)

The triangular colonial stone fort was built by the Dutch in 1631 as defense for their colonial outpost and seaport at Sint Maarten. Located near Great Bay and Little Bay, it was captured by the Spanish only two years after it was built. The Spaniards occupied it as a military outpost supported by San Juan, Puerto Rico until the end of the long Eighty Years War in 1648.

In 1644 the Dutch attempted to recapture the fort. A sizeable expedition led by the Dutch Governor of Curaçao, Aruba and Bonaire (later governor of New Amsterdam [New York]), Peter Stuyvesant made a bloody and unsuccessful attempt to retake the fort and colony but was repelled by the Spaniards. Stuyvesant led the charge, making it all the way to the top of the northwestern rampart, but was severely wounded in the attempt. As a result of the Attack on Saint Martin he lost his leg which was later replaced with a wooden peg leg.

At the end of the war the partition agreement and Treaty of Westphalia was signed by the Dutch Republic Spain and France in 1648. The island, and therefore the Fort, briefly changed hands many times between the Dutch Republic, England and France during the colonial era but has been primarily Dutch for most of its history.

Today, the fort is small, and in a decaying state of repair, but still worth visiting and commands a great view of the harbor. There are several rusting 19th century cannons in place, and several informational maps and signs illustrating the development of the fort and its history.

== Important Bird Area ==
The fort is on a peninsula about 2.5 km long and is a registered historical site, consisting of several ruins. There is a breeding colony of brown pelicans, of up to 60 nests, on the west side of the point, on a slope below the fort. The 278 ha site has been identified as an Important Bird Area by BirdLife International. The vegetation is characterized by thorny scrubland of Acacia macracantha and A. tortuosa, reaching over 2 m in height.

== See also ==
- History of St. Martin
- Franco-Dutch treaty on Saint Martin border controls
- Treaty of Concordia
