= Attack on Saint Martin =

1644 battle of the Eighty Years' War

Coordinates: 18.0237°N 63.0458°W

- Part of the Eighty Years' War
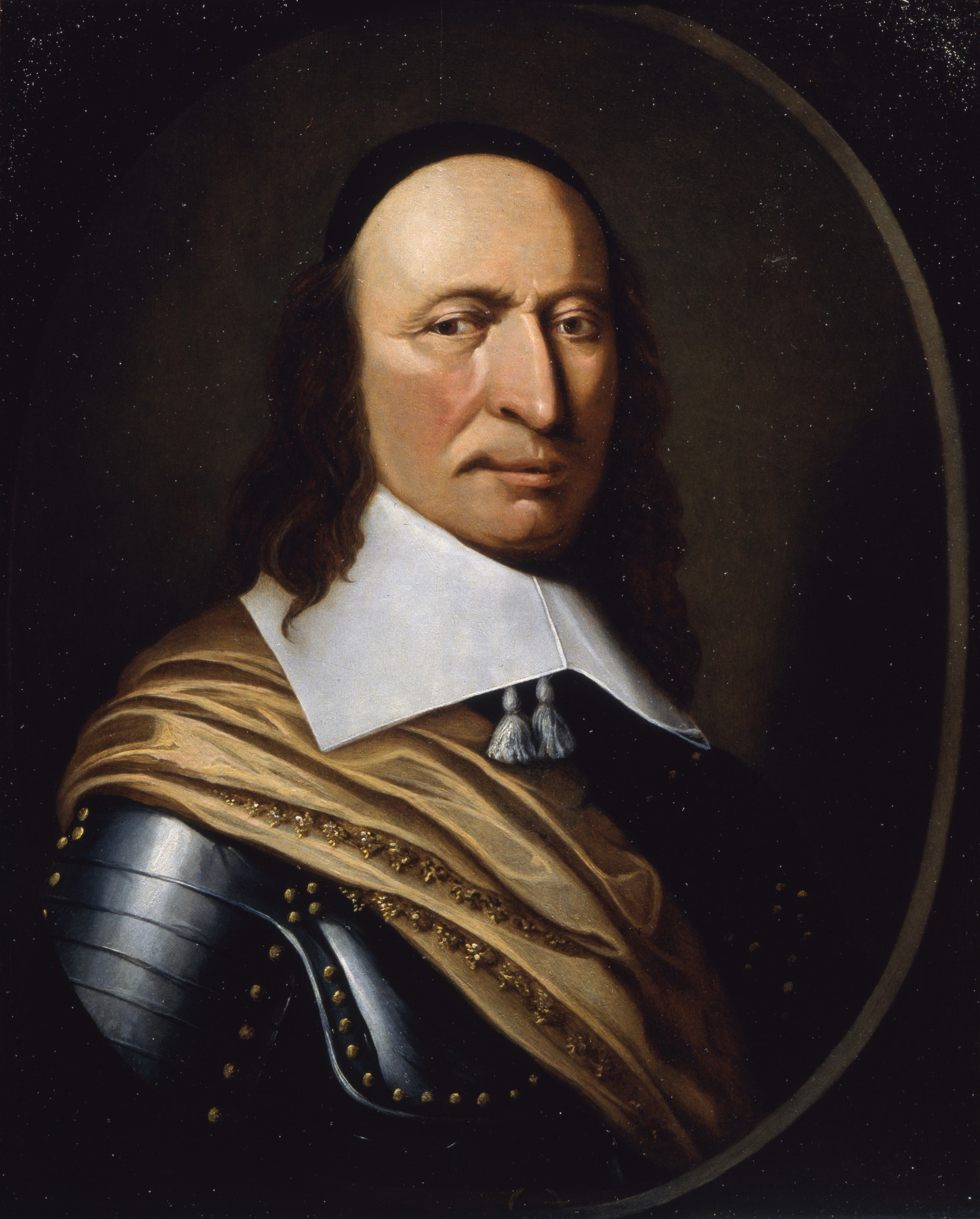
Date	20 March – 17 April 1644
Location	Fort Amsterdam, Sint Maarten, Caribbean Sea
Result	Spanish victory

Belligerents
Dutch Republic	Spain

Commanders and leaders
(Dutch Republic) Peter Stuyvesant (WIA)	(Spain) Gov. Diego Guajardo Fajardo

Strength
8 ships 400~600 men	120 men

The Attack on Saint Martin was a failed attempt by the Dutch Republic to recapture the island and former base of the Dutch West India Company (WIC) from the Spanish. In 1633 the Spanish had invaded Saint-Martin (Sint Maarten) and Anguilla, driving off the French and Dutch inhabitants. The French and Dutch banded together to repel the Spanish and it in 1644 the Dutch commander Peter Stuyvesant, later the governor of New Amsterdam, unsuccessfully besieged Fort Amsterdam and was forced to retreat with the loss of hundreds of men. A stray Spanish cannonball shattered his leg, which had to be amputated. But luck was on the Dutch side, and when the Eighty Years' War between Spain and the Netherlands ended, the Spanish no longer needed a Caribbean base and just sailed away in 1648.

== Background ==
The Spanish, who had been content with their lucrative holdings in the Greater Antilles, began to notice the successful French, English, and Dutch settlements springing up in the Lesser Antilles. Remembering their Pope-given rights, thousands of Spanish troops stormed St.Martin in 1638, took control of the island and built the Old Spanish Fort at Point Blanche.

Six years later, Peter Stuyvesant (later the governor of Nieuw Amsterdam) directed his Dutch troops in an unsuccessful effort to retake the island.

== Attack ==
Governor Pieter Stuyvesant of Curaçao sent five large Dutch ships, a pink, and two tenders on a campaign to reconquer the former WIC base of Sint Maarten. After pausing at Saint Kitts to recruit English and French volunteers, he arrived off the eastern shores of Sint Maarten at dawn on 20 March, accompanied by a half-dozen merchantmen that continued further north; Stuyvesant's squadron veered inshore and besieged the lone Spanish fortification, then anchored nearby and disembarked several hundred troops. The Dutch spent the next two days installing a three-gun battery atop some heights; on 22 March they called on Spanish Governor Diego Guajardo Fajardo to lay down his arms. Despite low morale, poor equipment, and insufficient rations, the 120-man Spanish garrison refused to surrender, and Stuyvesant initiated a long-range bombardment next dawn. A chance Spanish countershot carried off the Dutch commander's right leg while he was standing beside his battery, requiring Stuyvesant to be carried back aboard ship for amputation below the knee. The injury left the small army leaderless, undermining its resolve.

On the night of 31 March–1 April an assault column under cover of darkness advanced toward the Spanish positions, almost escaping the sentinels’ detection because all were musketeers (and hence carry no lit cords). Once the Dutch intruders were discovered, however, a firefight erupted until dawn; at least five Dutch attackers were killed, as opposed to a single Spaniard. A second, even more half-hearted attempt was made at 9pm on 3 April, which was easily repelled; no further assaults were made.

On the night of 15–16 April, a Puerto Rican coaster under Sargento Mayor Baltasar de Alfaro landed refreshments for Guajardo's garrison, snapping the besiegers’ will. The Dutch retired to their ships; a rearguard blew up the siege guns and fires the encampments by 17 April, and the flotilla departed toward Sint Eustatius and then Curaçao. Stuyvesant eventually returned toward Holland in August to convalesce from his wound.

== Aftermath ==
The year the Spanish left because of the agreements made in the Treaties of Concordia and Westphalia, the French and Dutch returned and divided the island – 16 square miles (41 km^{2}) to the Dutch and 21 square miles (54 km^{2}) to the French. For the next two centuries there were occasional clashes between the two nations for complete control of the island, but in 1869 a new agreement was reached honoring the original boundaries set in 1648. This would be updated in 2023 for a last time, defining the exact borders in disputed areas. The two-nation island has for the most part existed peacefully ever since.
