= French Guiana Prefecture Building =

French administrative building

- Hôtel de préfecture de la Guyane
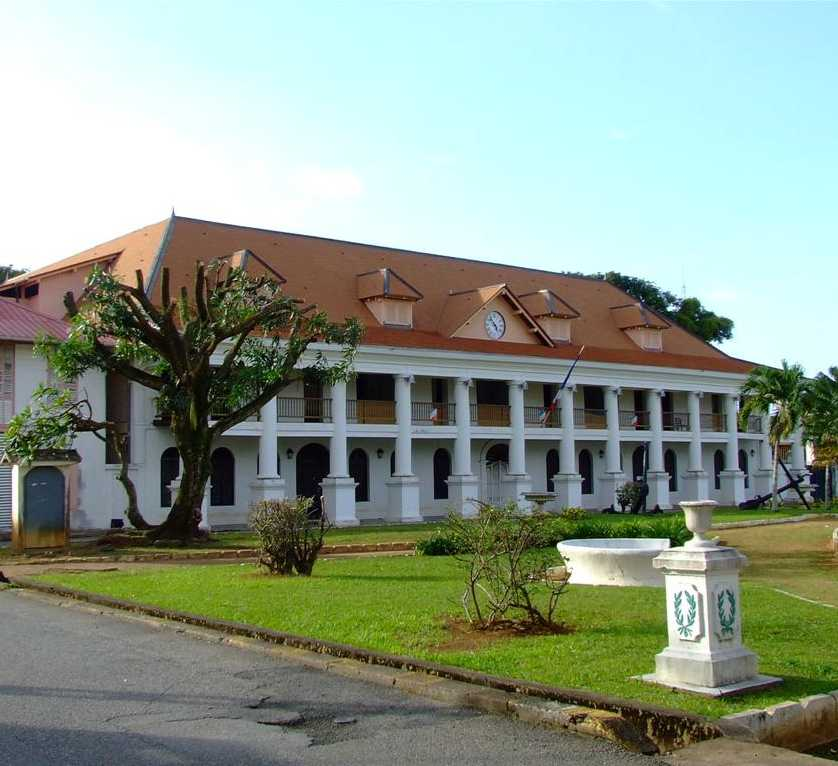

- Location within French Guiana

General information
- Location: Cayenne, French Guiana
- Coordinates: 4.94047°N 52.33571°W
- Completed: 1729 (original); 1925 (current)
- Client: Prefecture of French Guiana; Ministry of Armed Forces

The French Guiana Prefecture Building (French: Hôtel de préfecture de la Guyane) is the seat of the Prefect of French Guiana. It is located in Cayenne, French Guiana, France. It was originally built as a monastery of the Jesuits. In 1762, it became the headquarters of the Colonial Government. Since 1946, it is used by the prefecture. In 1978, it became a monument historique (historic monument).

== History ==
In 1679, the Society of Jesus received permission to build a simple wooden house at the site. In 1729, the building was replaced by a brick U-shaped structure and served as a monastery, and mission for the conversion of slaves and Amerindians.

In 1762, the Jesuits were expelled from the colony, and the Colonial Government moved into the building. In 1787, the building was renovated. In 1801, Victor Hugues took residence in the building, and the first floor became the seat of the Governors of French Guiana. In 1925, the building was reconstructed and a colonnade with 13 columns was added to the front of the building.

From 1946 to 1982, the building was used by the Prefecture of French Guiana. In 1984, the Ministry of Armed Forces was relocated to the ground floor and the remainder of the building was renovated. Since 1985, the first floor is home to the seat of the Prefect of French Guiana.
