= Monastery of San Francisco, Santo Domingo =

UNESCO World Heritage Site
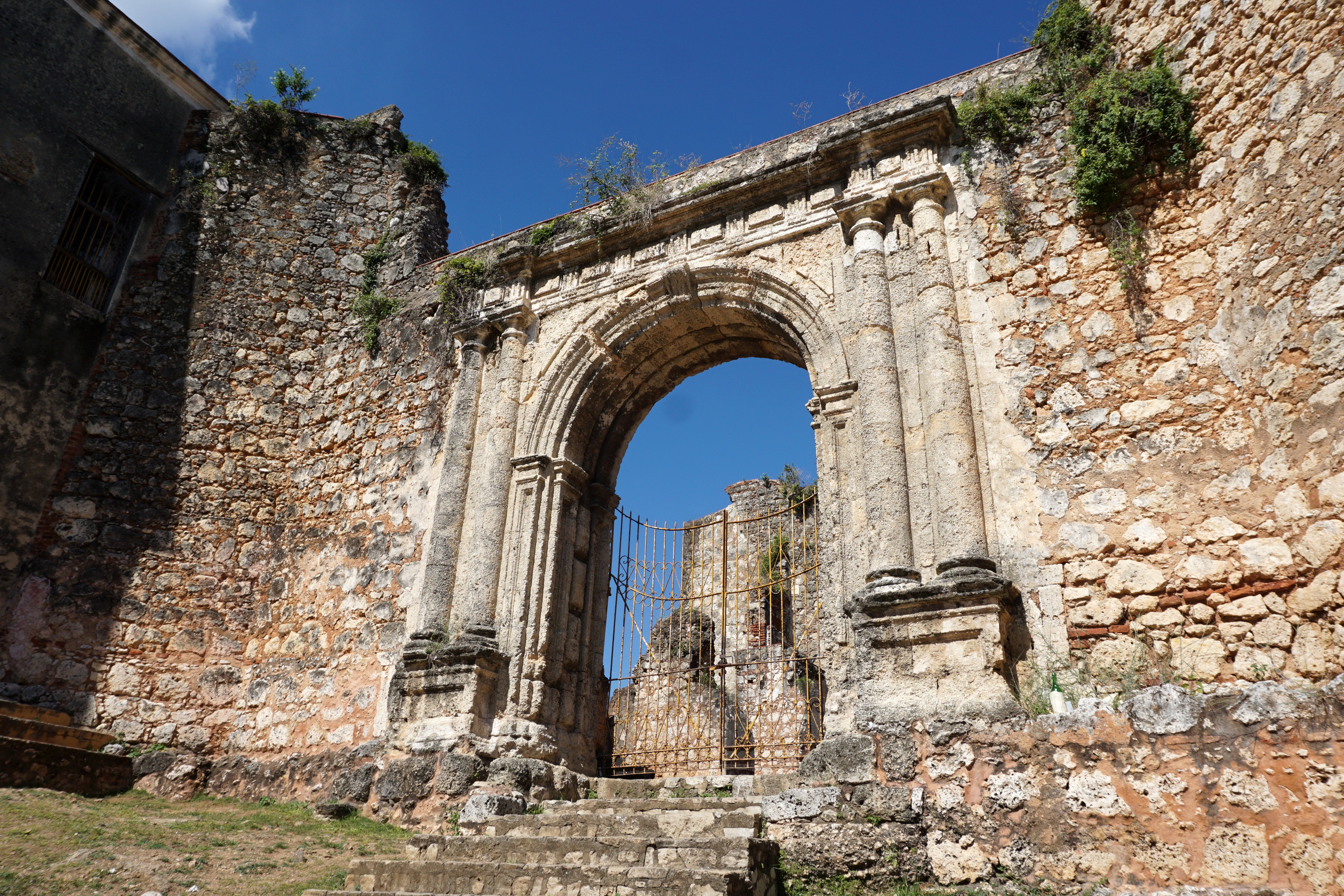
- Ruins of the Monasterio de San Francisco

- Location within the Dominican Republic
- Location: Santo Domingo, Dominican Republic
- Part of: Colonial City of Santo Domingo
- Criteria: Cultural: (ii), (iv), (vi)
- Reference: 526
- Inscription: 1990 (14th Session)
- Coordinates: 18°28′37″N 69°53′08″W

Monasterio de San Francisco in Santo Domingo de Guzmán, Dominican Republic, is a monastery that was built between 1508–1560, with the arrival of the Franciscan fathers. The ruin is one of the most important of the city. It is located in the Colonial City of Santo Domingo and are part of UNESCO's 1990 declaration of the Colonial City as a World Heritage Site. The monastery was recognized by UNESCO for being the first and oldest monastery built in the Americas.

== History ==
The Monastery of San Francisco was one of the works of Nicolás de Ovando, which began its construction when the Franciscan fathers arrived in 1508 and was completed in 1560. It was the first monastery in the New World, later, it was whipped for a hurricane.

The main part of the church is started by Liendo in 1544 on a hill and finished on July 23, 1556. In 1586 it was looted by the English pirate Francis Drake, and then its repair began again, which was completed in 1664, but according to historians, in 1673 and 1751, two earthquakes occurred, which caused damage to the architecture of the San Francisco Monastery.

According to historians, Alonso de Ojeda was buried at the main entrance of the monastery. Sometime later, his remains were transferred to the Dominican Convent on October 12, 1942, in the same place where they were found in 1892. The remains of Bartholomew Columbus were also found.

During the Siege of Santo Domingo in 1809, after the defeat at the Battle of Palo Hincado, the French placed artillery on the roof of the main church. The vault was cut and in its place, a wooden platform with artillery was placed, which later collapsed.

During the domination of the Haitians 1822-1844, in 1831 they took the stones and architectural details and in 1847 they were used again in the walls as construction material.

During the passage of the San Zenón cyclone in 1930, a large part of the building was destroyed and in 1940 the Padre Billini leprosy hospital and asylum were installed there. The bells of San Francisco were relocated to the bell tower of the neighboring Church of Santa Bárbara.

The ruins of the Monastery of San Francisco include the ruins of the Chapel of la Tercera Orden de Garay or de María de Toledo. Through its tub, the water is distributed in all the pipes to the inhabitants of the Ciudad Colonial, it was even the first aqueduct in the city. Currently, these ruins are used for social and cultural events and are cared for and protected by law and by the Permanent National Commission of National Ephemeris of the Dominican Republic.

== Gallery ==
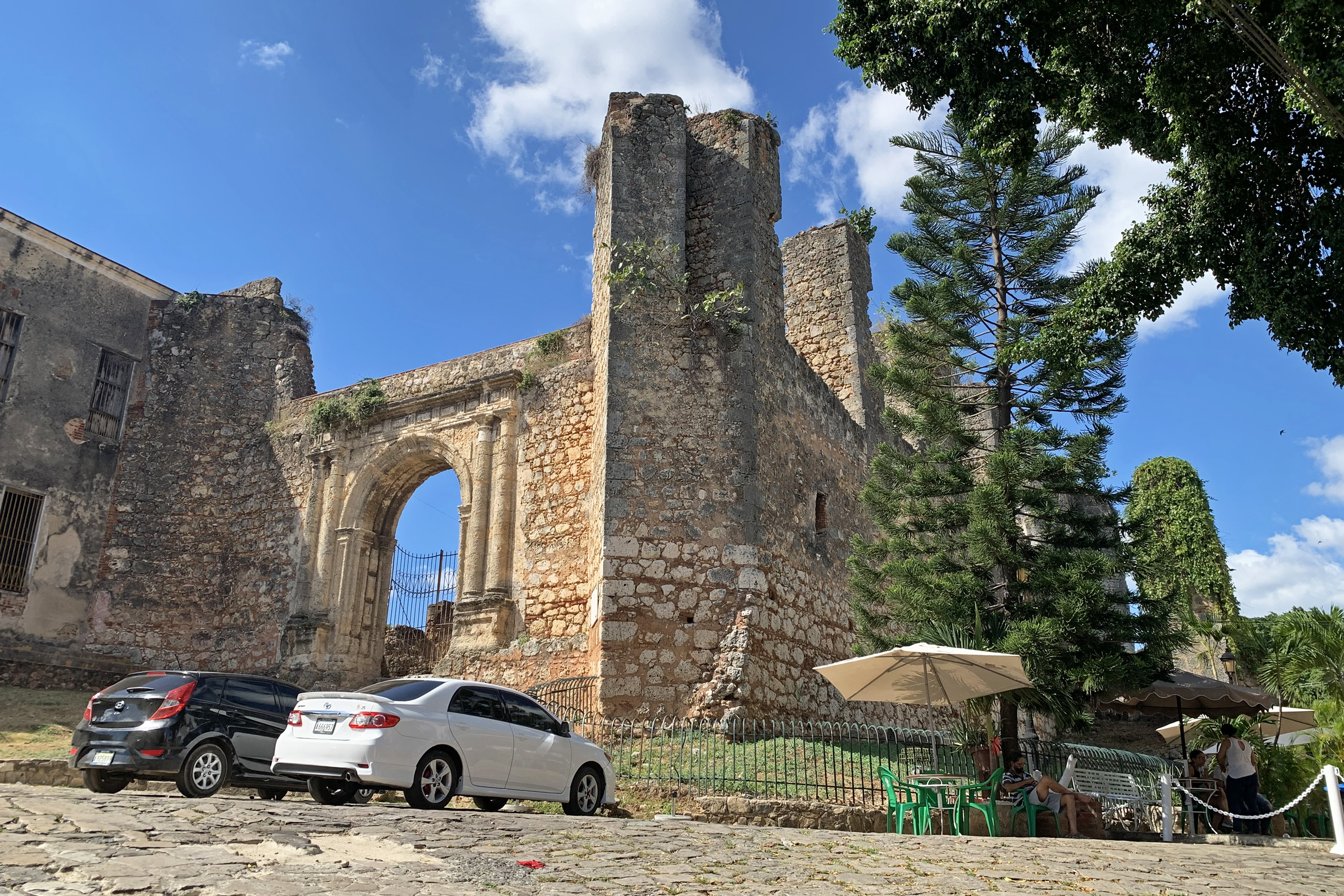

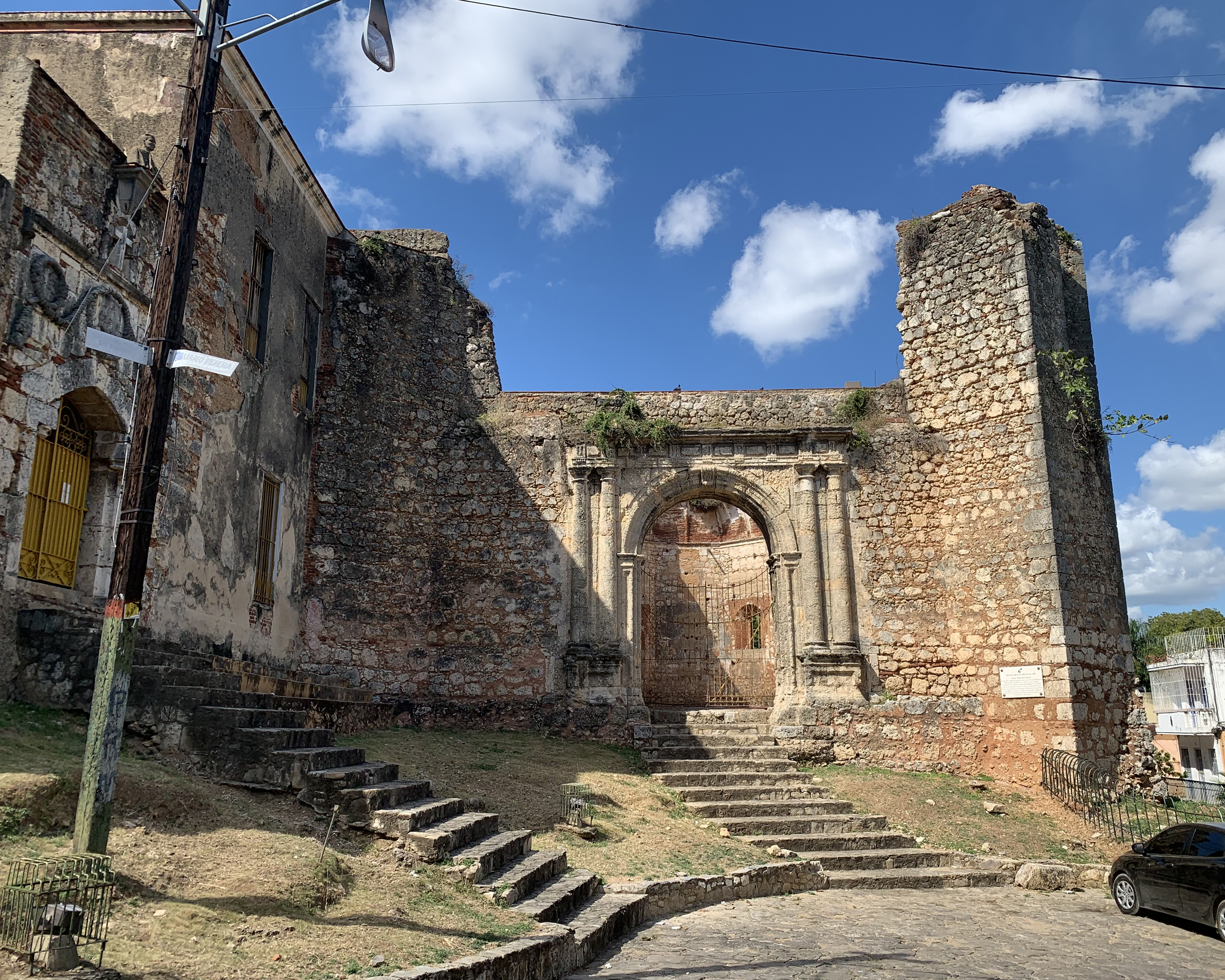

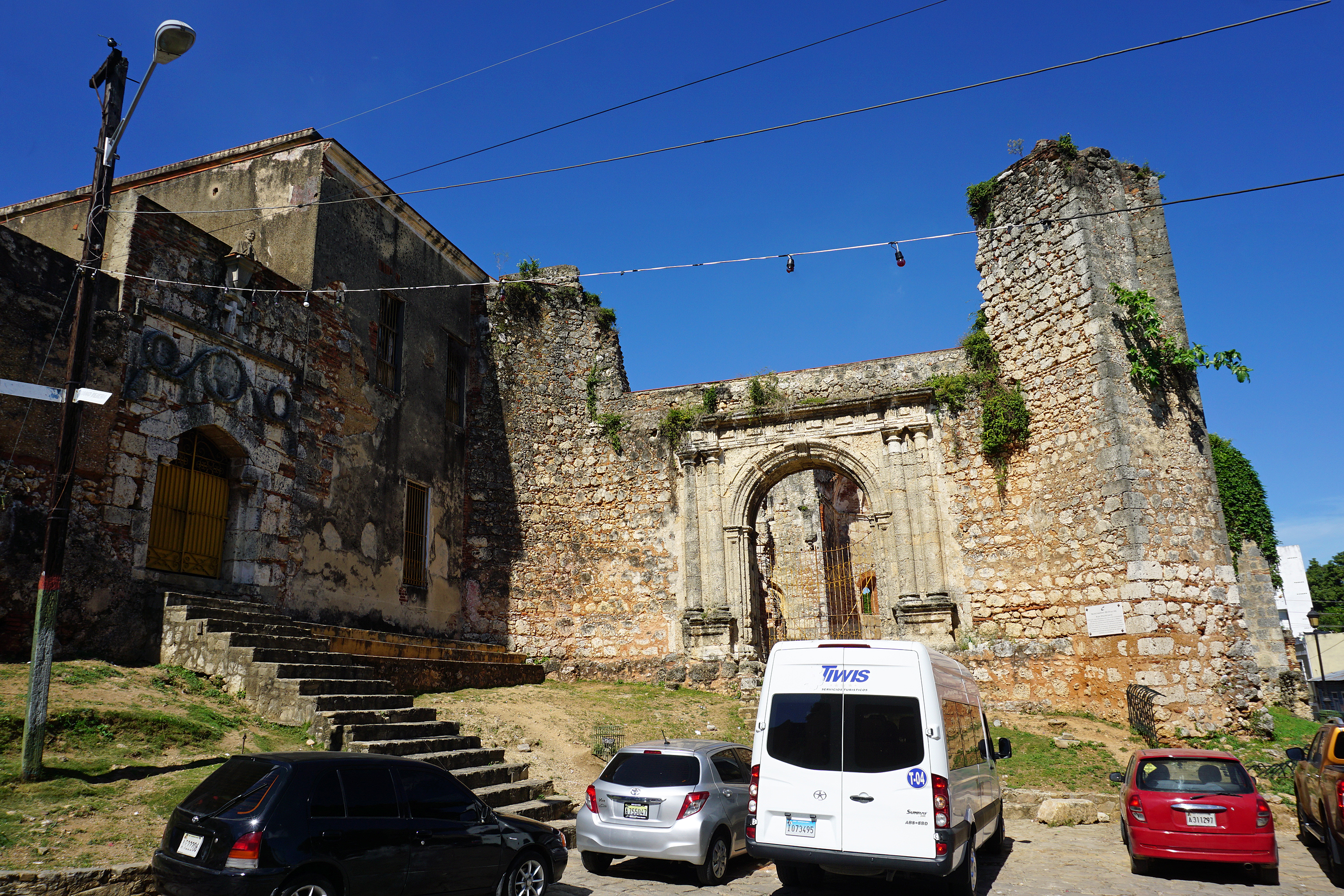
Main entrance to the church

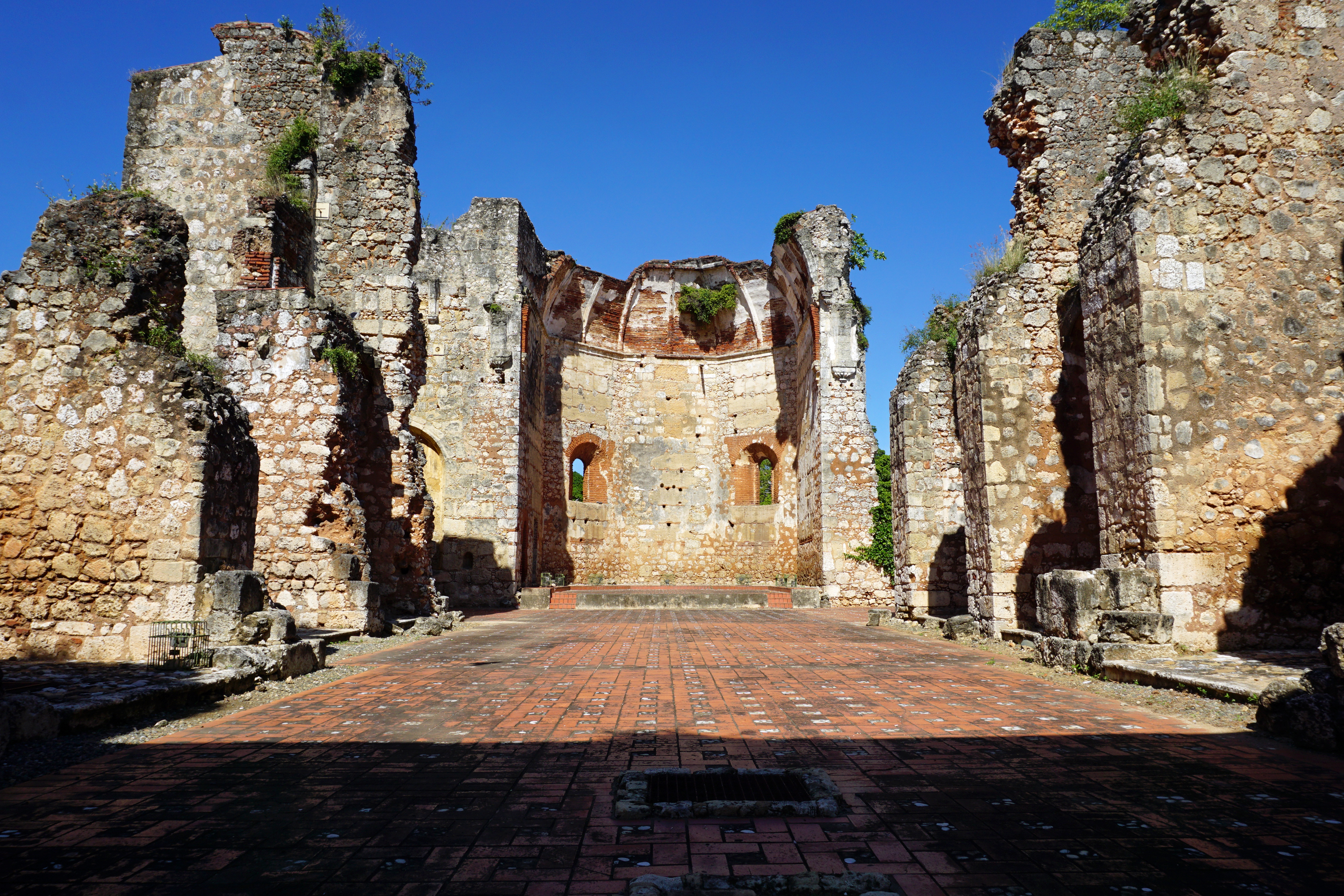
Nave of the main church

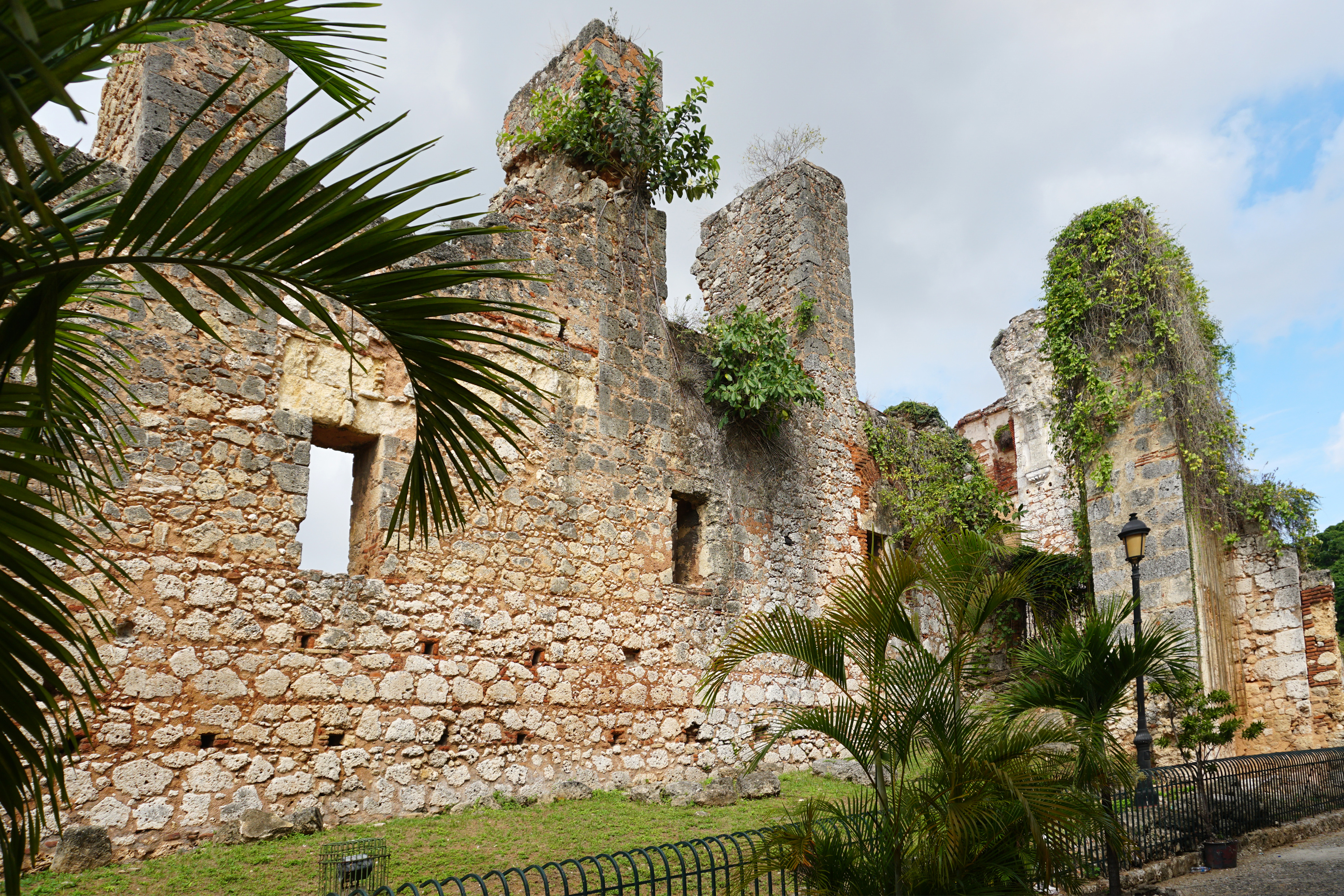

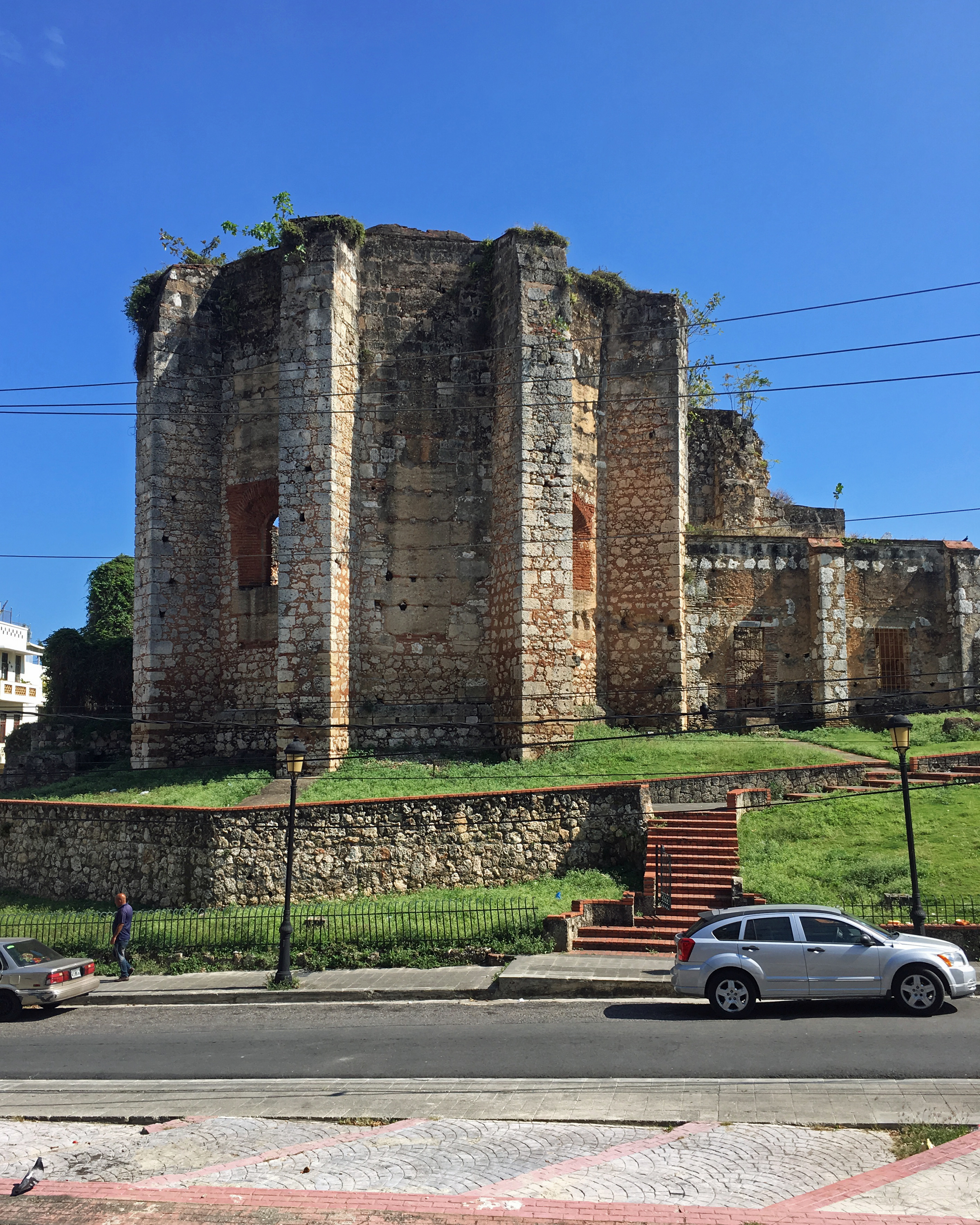
Exterior view of the apse of the main church

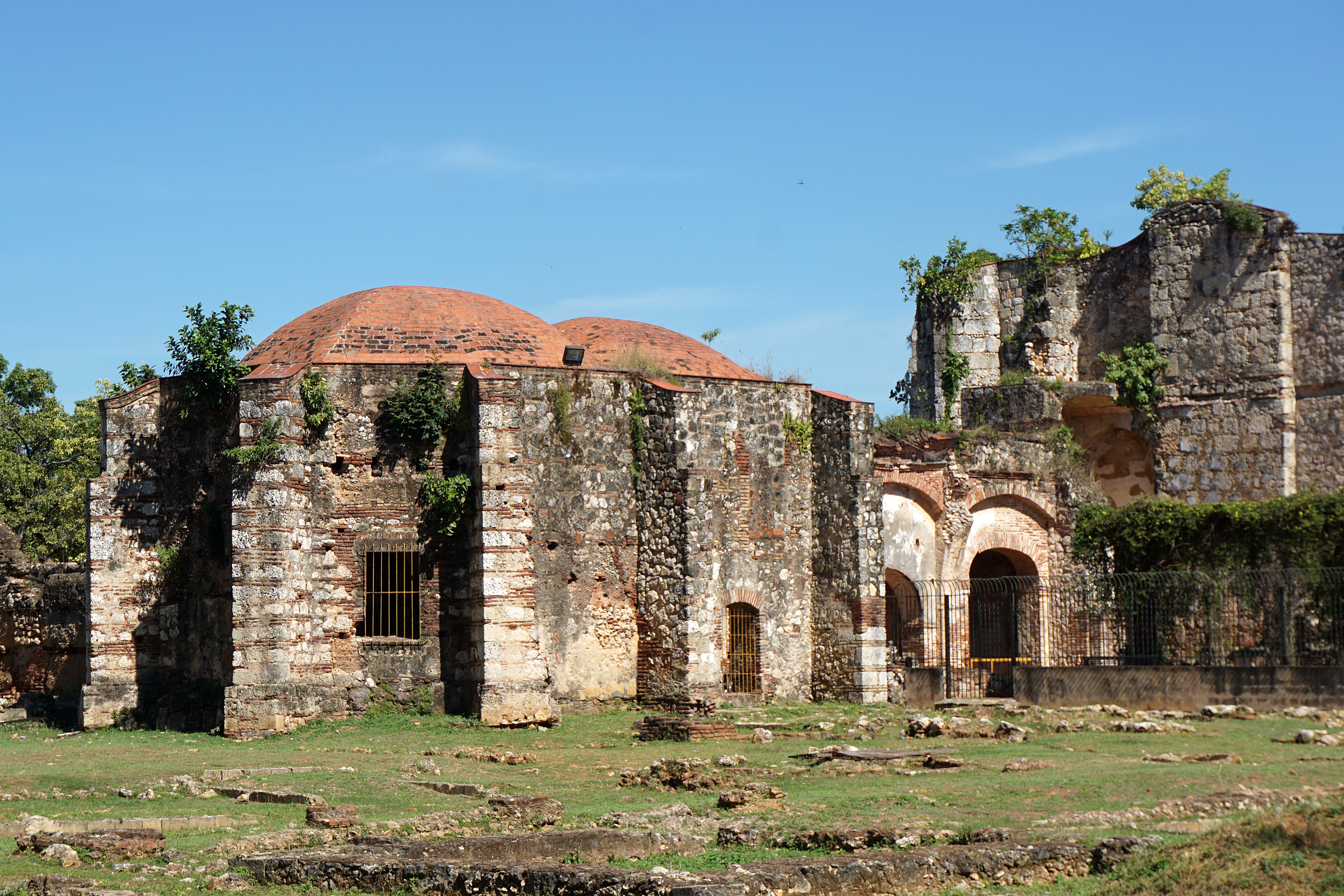
Exterior view of the Chapel of the Third Order

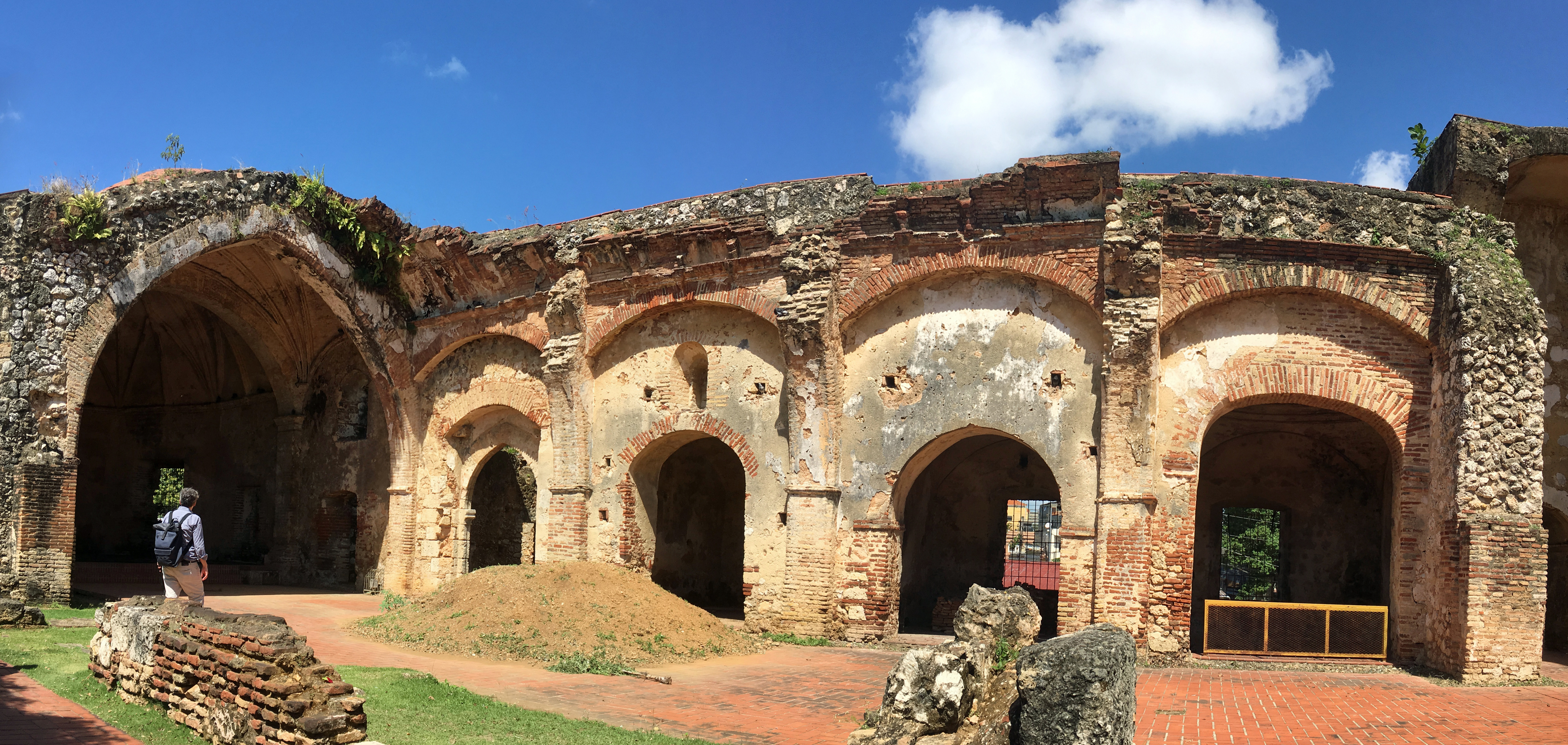
Interior view of the Chapel of the Third Order

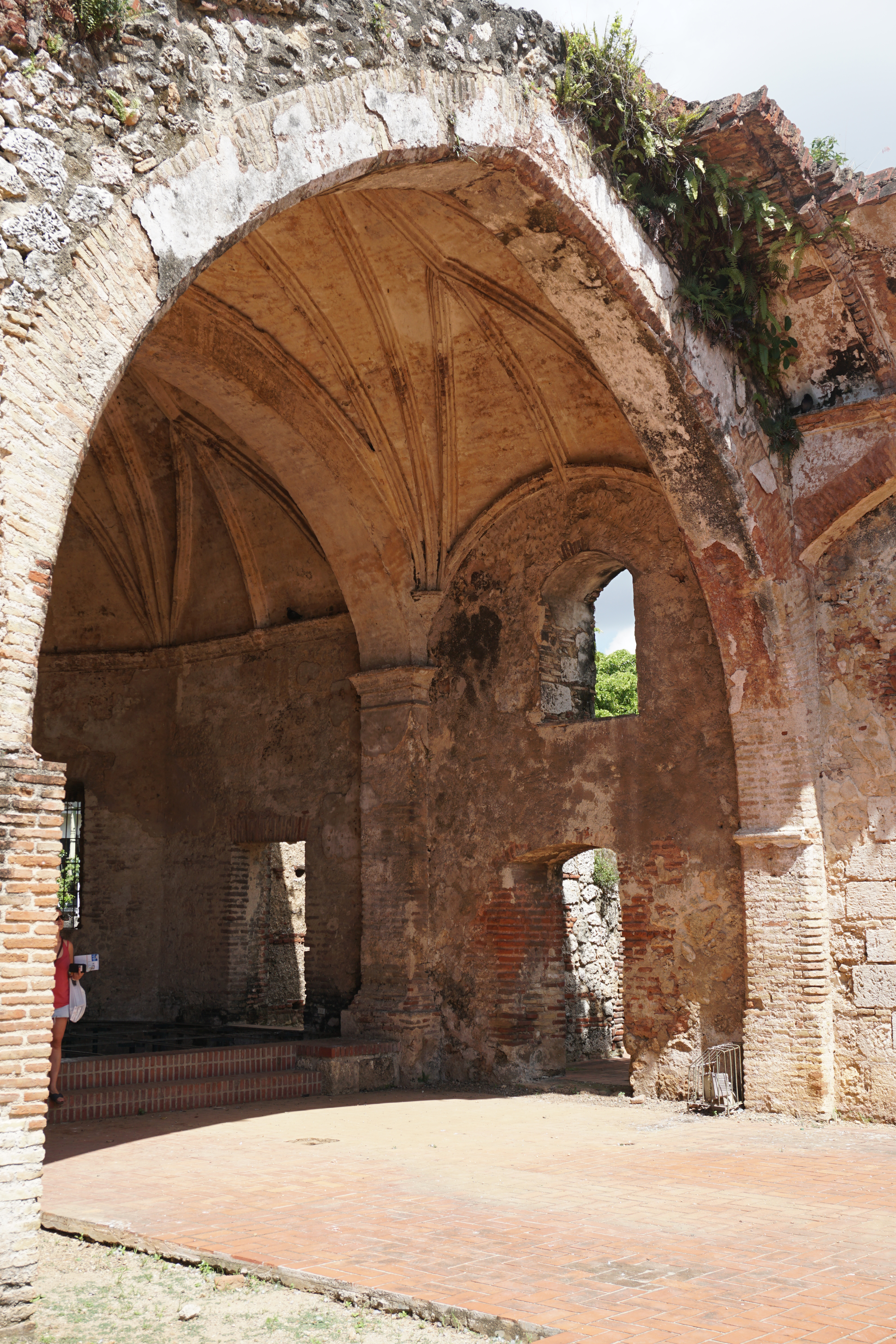
Rib vaults of the Chapel of the Third Order

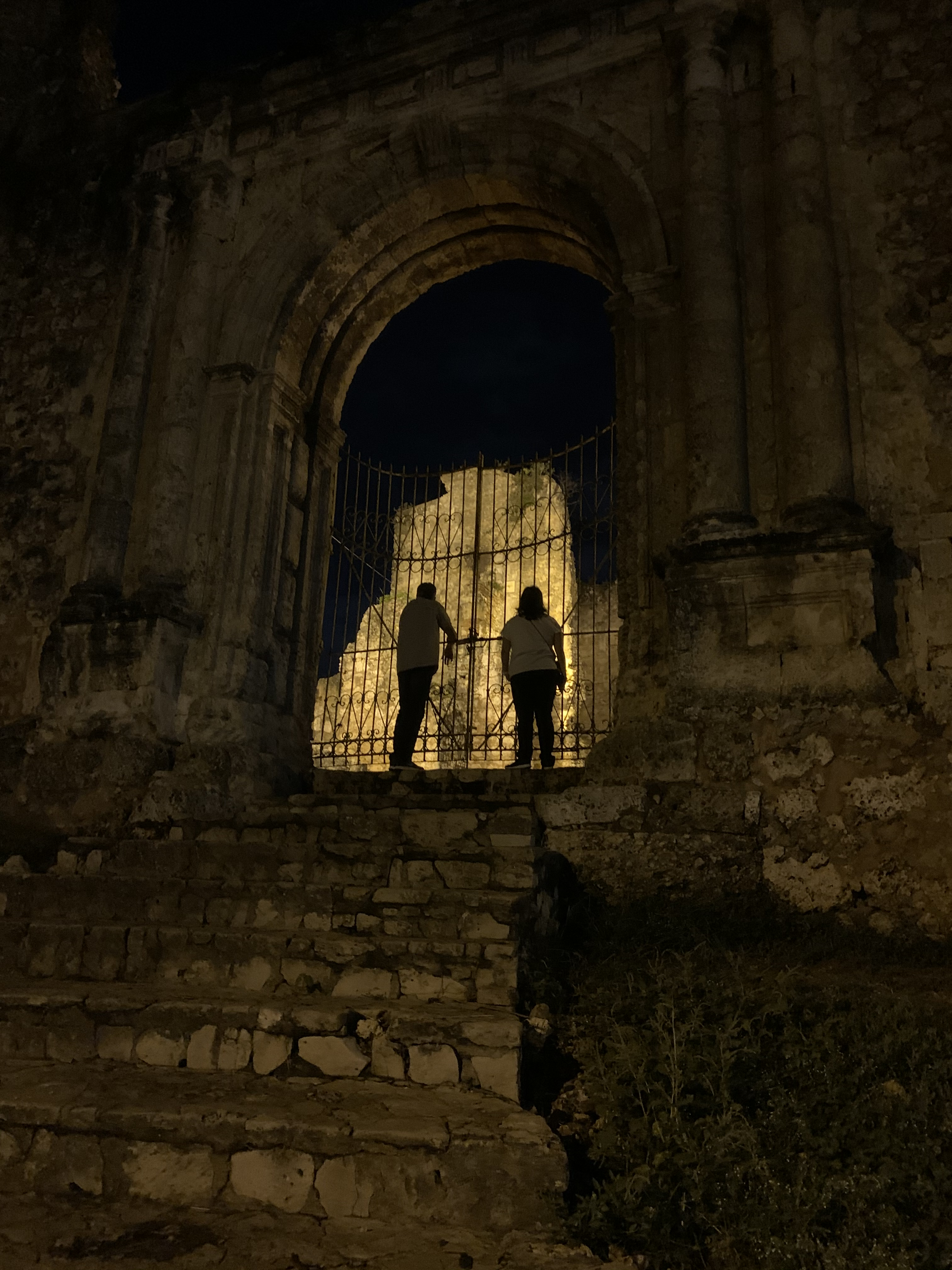
Night view of the main gate

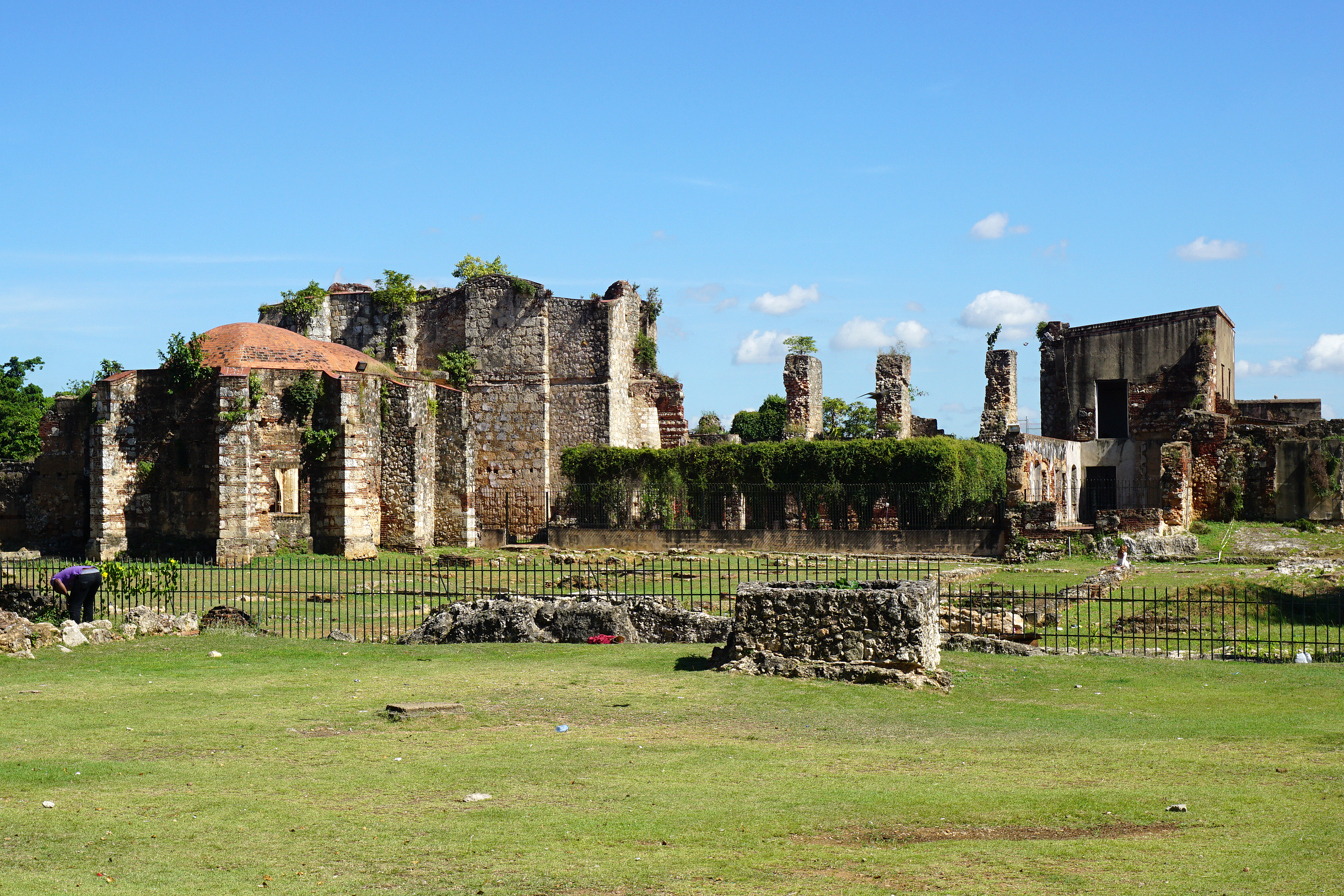
Panoramic view of the monument

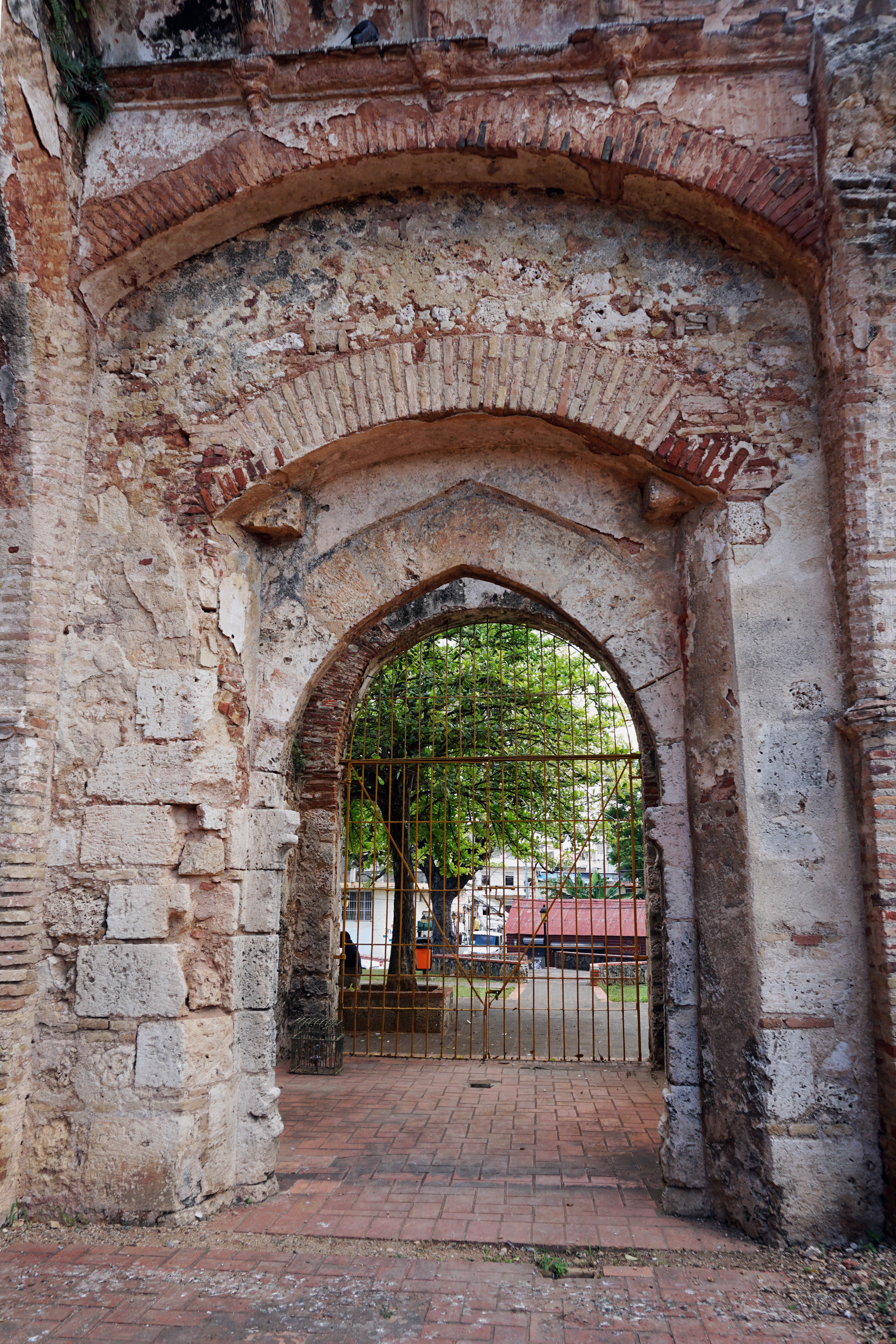

== See also ==
- List of colonial buildings in Santo Domingo
- List of oldest buildings in the Americas
