= Thomas Huxley (British Army officer) =

British Army officer (died 1826)

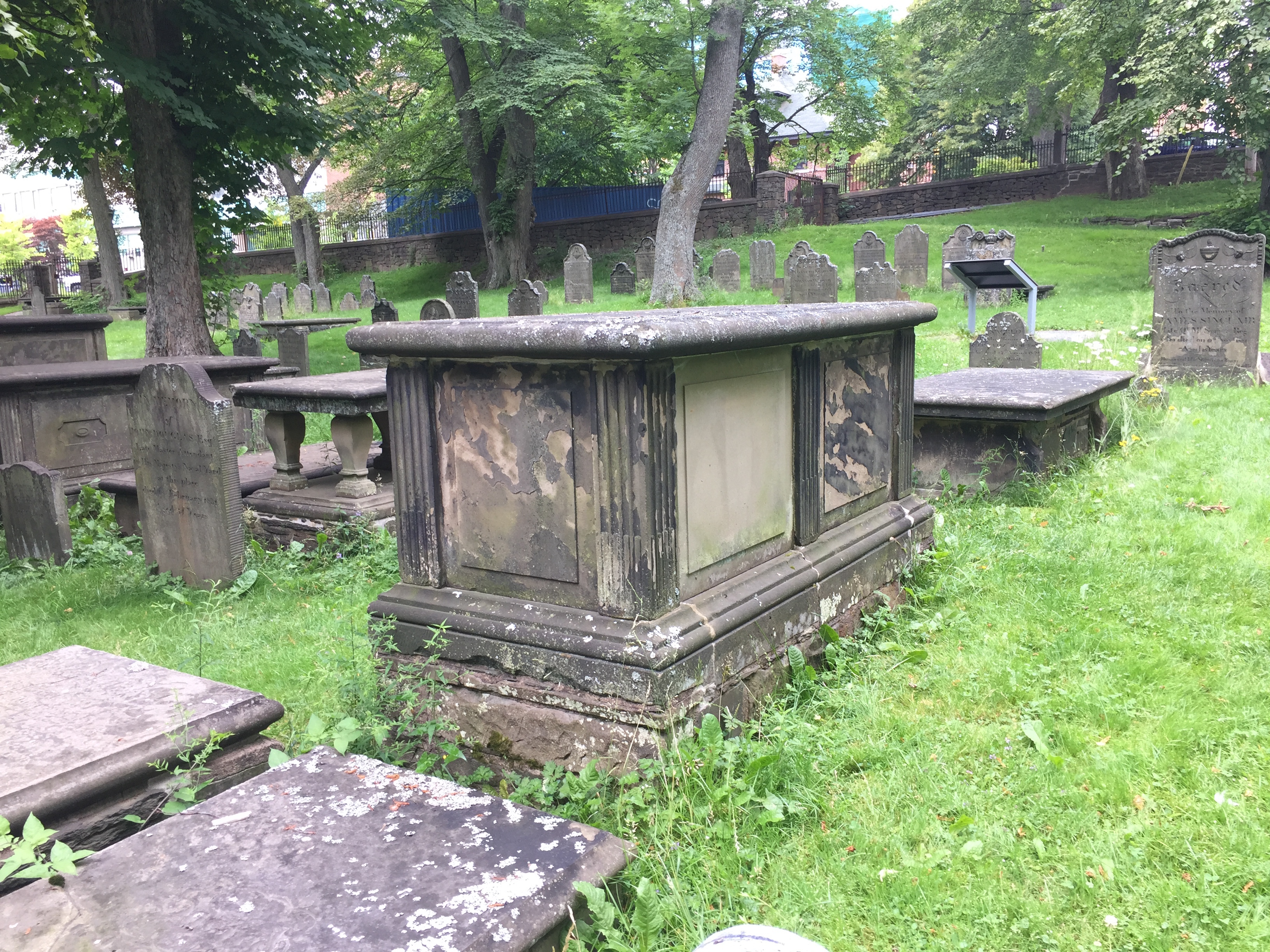
Thomas Huxley, Old Burying Ground, Halifax, Nova Scotia

Lieutenant-Colonel Thomas Huxley (died 4 November 1826, Halifax) was a British Army officer. He joined the 87th Foot Regiment in 1799, and was made Captain in the 4th West India Regiment in 1808, and then Captain in the 70th Foot regiment in 1819. When he was part of the 70th Regiment, he married Jessie Scott, the niece of Sir Walter Scott. He later became the Military Secretary to Lord Dalhousie, the Governor General of British North America.

On 5 November 1819 in Kingston, Ontario, he married Jessie Scott, niece of Sir Walter Scott (daughter of Walter's younger brother Thomas Scott, b. 1774), paymaster of the regiment. Sir Walter Scott described Huxley as "a very gentleman-like man." He became Lt Col. in 1826 and Military Secretary to Lord Dalhousie, the Governor General of Canada.

He killed himself on 4 November 1826 and was buried in the Old Burying Ground.
