= Our Lady of Ardilliers Church, Miquelon =

Coordinates: 47.1006°N 56.3778°W

Our Lady of Ardilliers Church
- Église Notre-Dame-des-Ardilliers de Miquelon
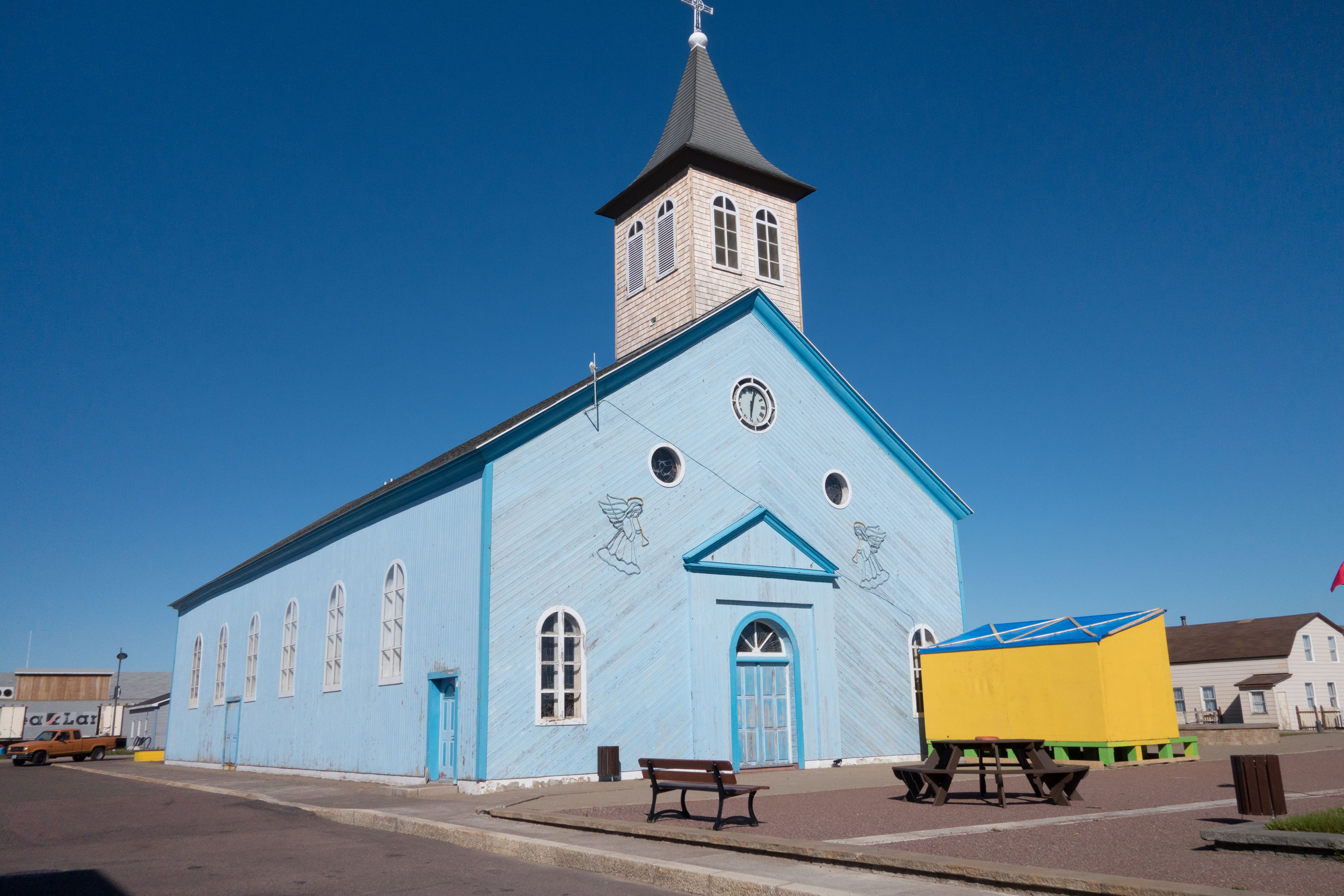
- Our Lady of Ardilliers Church
- Location: Miquelon
- Country: Saint Pierre and Miquelon; France
- Denomination: Roman Catholic Church

History
- Dedication: Our Lady
- Consecrated: 1 November 1865

Architecture
- Functional status: parish church
- Heritage designation: classified Monument Historique
- Designated: 2011
- Years built: 1862–1865

Administration
- Diocese: La Rochelle and Saintes
- Parish: Miquelon

Clergy
- Archbishop: Jérôme Daniel Beau

Our Lady of Ardilliers Church (French: Église Notre-Dame-des-Ardilliers de Miquelon) is a Catholic church located in Miquelon-Langlade, in the archipelago of Saint Pierre and Miquelon, a dependent territory of France in the North Atlantic Ocean. Since the abolition of the Apostolic Vicariate of Iles Saint Pierre and Miquelon on 1 March 2018, it is attached to the diocese of La Rochelle and Saintes, meaning the church is under the jurisdiction of the Archbishop of Poitiers. The current Archbishop is Jérôme Daniel Beau.

== Building ==
The church can be found near the port in the village of Miquelon, on the island of the same name. It is constructed entirely from wood and rectangular in shape, with a gable roof and a steeple above the façade.

The building was constructed between 1862 and 1865 to replace the first church in the archipelago, which was in disrepair. Inaugurated in 1865, the church is named in honor of Father Ardilliers and his sister, a nun at Notre-Dame-des-Ardilliers in Saumur, who probably funded the construction of first church in Miquelon.

There are several art pieces inside the church, including a wooden boat made by a local craftsman around 100 years ago. Saint Peter, sometimes known as Saint Pierre, is the patron saint of fishermen. There is also a painting of the Holy Family by artist Joseph Lemoine, dating from the 1800s. The stained glass windows in the church are not original and date from the 1980s and 1990s.
