= La Merced Church (Honduras) =

Historic monument in Comayagua (Honduras)

Coordinates: 14.45738°N 87.63958°W

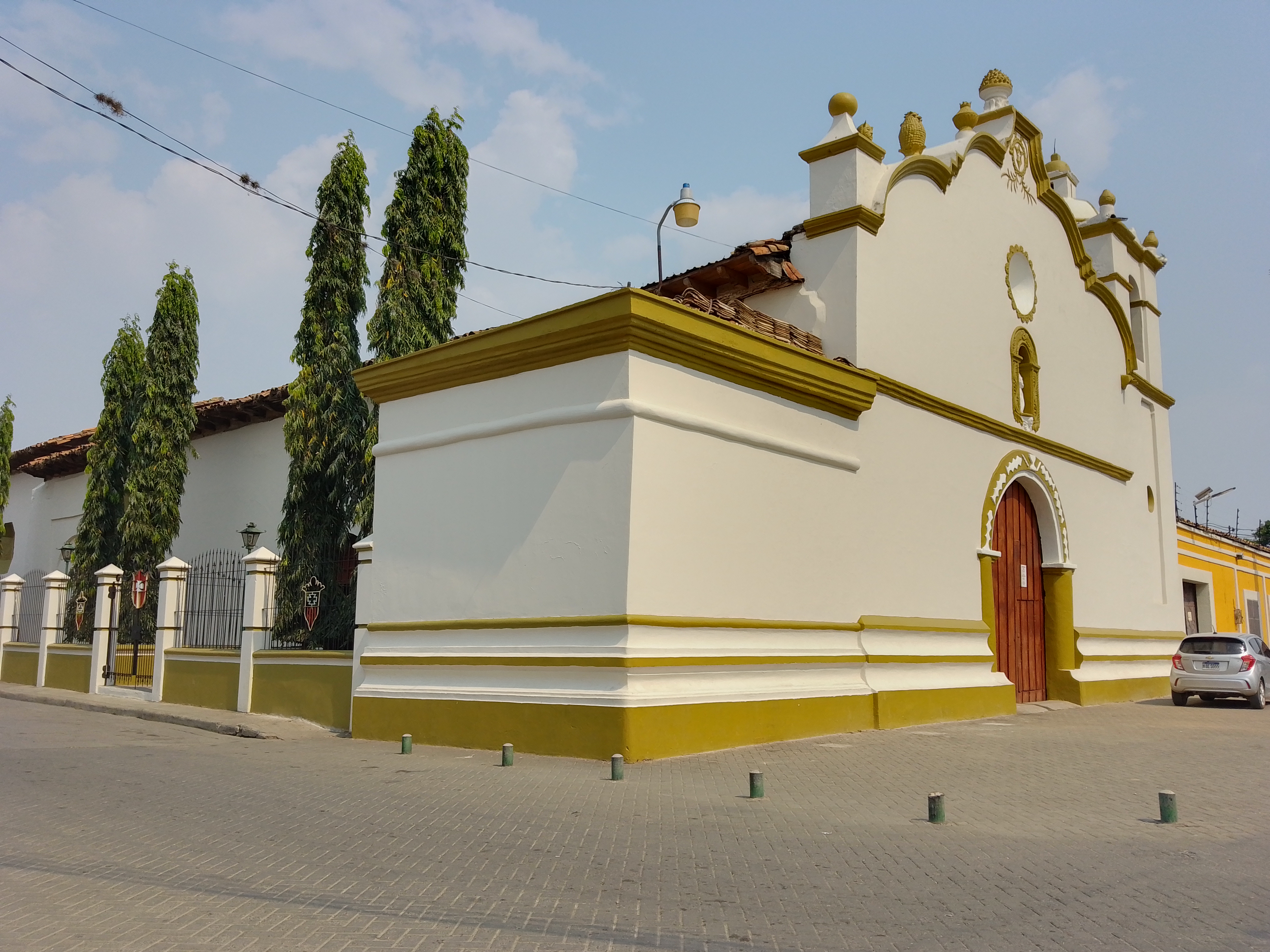
The church in 2023.

The Merced church (Spanish: Iglesia de la Merced) is a Catholic church in Comayagua, Honduras built in 1550 during the colonial era of New Spain. It is the oldest church in Honduras, being built in 1550 by Fray Gaspar de Quintanilla with the name of Iglesia de la Inmaculada Concepción. It was also the first Honduran church to receive the cathedral designation in 1561 meaning that is the oldest church still in foot in Honduras, although it now functions as a parish. The church is dedicated to the Virgen de la Merced and is located in the historic colonial quarter of Comayagua.

== History ==
The church was built in 1550 during the early colonial era of Honduras by Fray Gaspar de Quintanilla, However, it was not the first to be built in Honduras since the first was the Trujillo church, but it is the oldest Catholic temple still standing since the Trujillo Church disappeared in the 19th century. In 1561 it was elevated to the title of cathedral, the first in Honduras. In 1774 there was an earthquake that destroyed one of the church towers. In 1820, the president of Honduras, Coronado Chávez, had the main altarpiece built. Today the church continues to function as a parish and is a historical and tourist monument of the country.

=== Architecture ===
The church has a Baroque or American Baroque or more late colonial Renaissance architectural design. When it was built in 1550, it was built with a thatched roof, but in 1551 it was rebuilt to its current appearance.

=== Current usage ===
The church was built with a capacity of 500 parishioners and the busiest days for the church are Sundays when about 250 people attend mass.

== See also ==
- History of Honduras
- Cathedral of immaculate conception
