= List of political parties in Sint Maarten =

This article lists political parties in Sint Maarten.

Sint Maarten has a multi-party system with numerous political parties, in which usually a single party does not have a chance of gaining power alone, and thus parties must work with each other to form coalition governments. Political parties tend to be loose political groupings, rather than supporting a consistent ideology, and as such, in the 2010s there were several instances of members of parties leaving to become unaffiliated, leading to the collapse of several coalition governments and snap elections.

== Parties ==
=== Parties represented in Parliament ===
| Party | Abbr. | Leader | Political position | Ideology | MPs |
|---|---|---|---|---|---|
| National Alliance; Nationale Alliantie | NA | Silveria Jacobs | Centre-left | Social democracy | 3 / 15 |
| Unified Resilient St. Maarten Movement | URSM | Luc Mercelina | Centre-left | Autonomism; Third way | 3 / 15 |
| Democratic Party; Democratische Partij | DM | Sarah Wescott-Williams | Centre-left | Christian left Social democracy | 3 / 15 |
| United People's Party; Verenigde Volkspartij | UP | Omar Ottley | Centre-right | | 2 / 15 |
| Party for Progress; Vooruitgangspartij | PFP | Melissa Gumbs | Centre-left | | 2 / 15 |
| Soualiga Action Movement | SAM | Franklin Meyers | Centre | | 1 / 15 |
| Nation Opportunity Wealth | NOW | Christophe Emmanuel | Centre | | 1 / 15 |

=== Other parties ===
- Citizens for Positive Change (4PC)
- Concordia Political Alliance (CPA)
- Empire Culture Empowerment Association (ECEA)
- One St. Maarten People Party (OSPP)
- Oualichi Movement for Change (OMC)
- People's Progressive Alliance (PPA)
- St. Maarten Christian Party (SMCP)
- Social Reform Party (SRP)
- United St. Maarten Party (US Party)

== See also ==
- List of political parties by country
