= Politics of Sint Maarten =

Sint Maarten, a constituent country of the Kingdom of the Netherlands, has a government formed by the monarch, represented by the governor, and the ministers. The Prime Minister of Sint Maarten presides over the council of ministers. Executive power is exercised by the government. Legislative power is vested in both the government and parliament. The minister plenipotentiary is not part of the government and represents the Sint Maarten government in the Netherlands. The judiciary is independent of the executive and the legislature. The country is a parliamentary representative democratic country with a multi-party system. Sint Maarten has full autonomy on most matters, with the exceptions summed up in the Charter for the Kingdom of the Netherlands under the title "Kingdom affairs". The Constitution of Sint Maarten was ratified in September 2010, and entered into force on 10 October 2010.

== Government ==
=== Executive power ===
Executive power rests with a governor, and a prime minister who heads a cabinet. The governor of Sint Maarten is appointed for a six-year term by the monarch, and the prime minister and deputy prime minister are elected by the Staten for four-year terms.

The cabinet or "council" of seven ministers is answerable to the parliament, which establishes the portfolio for each. The governor-general attends meetings of the council of ministers in an advisory capacity only. The prime minister and other ministers are appointed and dismissed by parliament. The Minister of Plenipotentiary must have Dutch nationality. This person represents the island in the Kingdom Council of Ministers meetings in The Hague in the European Netherlands. The minister also has an office in the Netherlands under the banner of the "St. Maarten House".

==== Current executive office holders ====
Main office-holders
Office	Name	Party	Since
King	Willem-Alexander		30 April 2013
Governor	Ajamu Baly		10 October 2022

==== Current cabinet ====
The cabinet is composed as follows:

Unified Resilient St. Maarten Movement (URSM) Democratic Party (DP) Party for Progress (Sint Maarten) (PFP) Nation Opportunity Wealth (N.O.W.)

Portfolio	Minister	Took office	Left office	Party	Remarks
Prime Minister; Minister of General Affairs	Luc Mercelina	3 May 2024	Incumbent	URSM	
Deputy Prime Minister; Minister of Public Health, Social Development and Labour (VSA); Acting Minister of Public Housing, Spatial Planning, Environment and Infrastructure	Veronica Jansen-Webster	3 May 2024	Incumbent	URSM	
Minister of Justice; Acting Minister of Education, Culture, Youth and Sports (ECYS)	Lyndon Lewis	3 May 2024	Incumbent	N.O.W.	
Minister of Finance	Marinka Gumbs	3 May 2024	Incumbent	DP	
Minister of Tourism, Economic Affairs, Transport and Telecommunication	Grisha Heyliger-Marten	3 May 2024	Incumbent	DP	Current member of parliament
Minister Plenipotentiary	Patrice Gumbs	3 May 2024	Incumbent	PFP	
Acting Minister Plenipotentiary	Gracita Arrindell	3 May 2024	Incumbent	URSM	

=== Legislative power ===
Legislative power is shared by the government and the legislature. The legislature or Staten is made up of 15 members elected by direct, popular vote to serve four-year terms.

=== Judicial power ===
Sint Maarten's judicial system, which has mainly been derived from the Dutch system, operates independently of the legislature and the executive. Jurisdiction, including appeal, lies with the Common Court of Justice of Aruba, Curaçao, Sint Maarten, and of Bonaire, Sint Eustatius and Saba and the Supreme Court of the Netherlands.

Sint Maarten is the only part of the Netherlands where laws can be evaluated against the constitution. Such an evaluation is performed by the Constitutional Court of Sint Maarten after a request by the Ombudsman of Sint Maarten after the law is passed.

As for the legal profession, the Order of Lawyers Sint Maarten (Orde van Advocaten Sint Maarten) has existed since 1989.

=== Other institutions ===
- Council of Advice
- General Audit Chamber
- Ombudsman

== History ==
- 2003 Netherlands Antilles island council elections
- 2007 Netherlands Antilles island council elections
- Constitution of Sint Maarten adopted by Sint Maarten Island Council, 21 July 2010
- 2010 Sint Maarten general election, 17 September 2010 - enlargement of the Island Council to 15 seats, First Wescot-Williams cabinet
- Dissolution of the Netherlands Antilles and new constitution takes effect - 10 October 2010, conversion of the Island Council to the Estates of Sint Maarten
- Second Wescot-Williams cabinet
- Third Wescot-Williams cabinet
- 2014 Sint Maarten general election - Gumbs cabinet
- First Marlin cabinet
- 2016 Sint Maarten general election - Second Marlin cabinet
- First Marlin-Romeo cabinet (caretaker)
- 2018 Sint Maarten general election - Second Marlin-Romeo cabinet
- Jacobs cabinet (caretaker)
- 2020 Sint Maarten general election - Second Jacobs cabinet
- January 2024 Sint Maarten general election - Luc Mercelina, prime minister

== Political movements ==
Currently, there is a movement in Sint Maarten which aims to unite the island of Saint Martin.
