= Jorien Wuite =

Sint Maarten-Dutch politician and civil servant

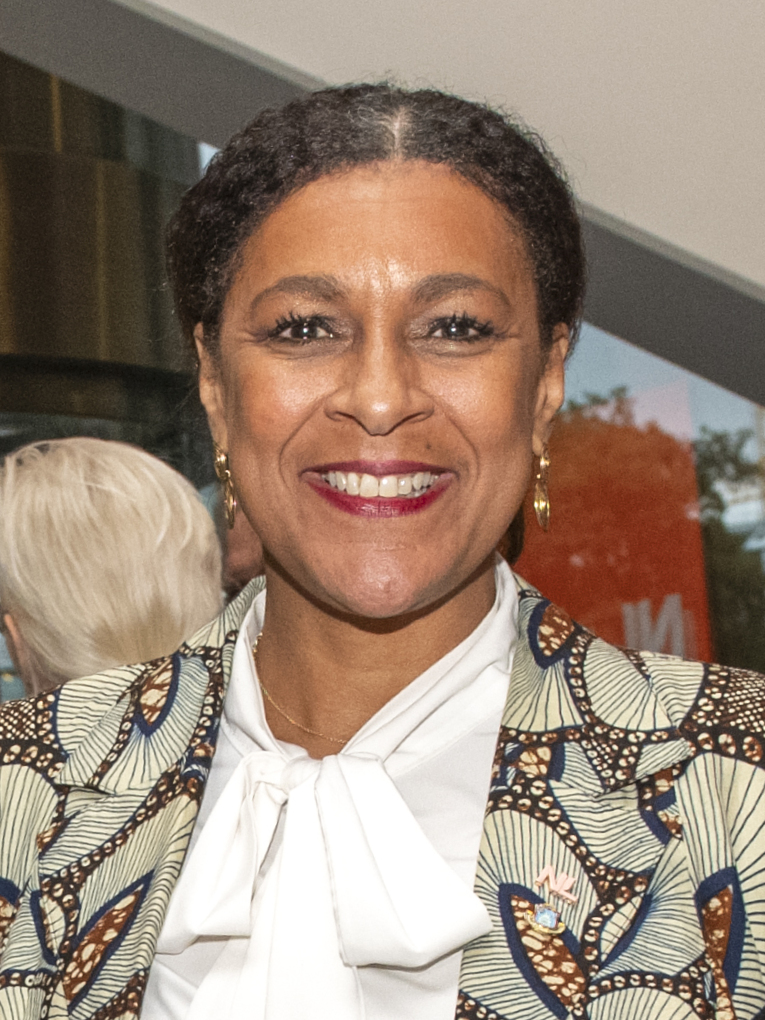
- Wuite in 2019

Member of the House of Representatives of the Netherlands
- Incumbent
- Assumed office 31 March 2021

Minister Plenipotentiary of Sint Maarten
- In office 25 June 2018 – 19 November 2019
- Prime Minister: Leona Marlin-Romeo and Wycliffe Smith
- Preceded by: Hasani Ellis (acting)
- Succeeded by: Silveria Jacobs (ad interim)

Minister of Education, Culture, Youth and Sports of Sint Maarten
- In office 15 January 2018 – 25 June 2018
- Prime Minister: Leona Marlin-Romeo
- Preceded by: Silveria Jacobs
- Succeeded by: Wycliffe Smith

Personal details
- Born: 6 December 1964 (age 61) The Hague, Netherlands
- Party: Democrats 66 (since 2020)
- Other political affiliations: Democratic Party; United Democrats
- Children: 2
- Education: Erasmus University Rotterdam; Open University
- Occupation: Politician; civil servant; diplomat
- Website: jorienwuite.com

Jorien Wuite (pronounced [joːˈriɱ ˈʋœytə]; born 6 December 1964) is a Sint Maarten-Dutch civil servant, diplomat, and politician. Born in The Hague, she moved to Sint Maarten aged 32 to work in government. She rose to the position of Minister of Education, Culture, Youth and Sports and served as Minister Plenipotentiary of Sint Maarten in the period 2018–19. She moved back to the European part of the Netherlands due to her election to the House of Representatives in 2021 as a member of the social liberal party Democrats 66 (D66).

== Early life and education ==
Wuite was born in The Hague and grew up in that area. Both her parents worked as educators, and her mother, Anna Merab Richardson, also a writer, is from Sint Maarten. She studied Public Health Management at Erasmus University Rotterdam in the years 1984–89 and conducted her graduation research on Sint Maarten. Wuite later did a second master's in Public Management & Policy at the Open University of the Netherlands (2008–12), and she studied international politics at Clingendael Institute in 2018.

== Career ==
After completing her studies, Wuite worked for five years as a management consultant for the Gouda company KVA Groep, which mostly assists the public sector. She subsequently moved to Sint Maarten with her family in 1997 to serve as the director of Sector Health Care Affairs for the Sint Maarten government. She became director of the Sector Public Health, Social Development and Labor Affairs in 2008 and filled that position until she was appointed secretary-general of that ministry two years later. Wuite was the secretary-general of the Ministry of Education, Culture, Youth and Sports between 2014 and 2018. During that period, she became politically active and ran for the Parliament of Sint Maarten in the 2016 general election as the third candidate of the Democratic Party (DP). She was not elected.

When the interim first Marlin-Romeo cabinet was formed in early 2018, Wuite became the Minister of Education, Culture, Youth and Sports on behalf of the United Democrats (UD). She was sworn in on 15 January and appeared again on the ballot in the February 2018 general election as the UD's twelfth candidate. The second Marlin-Romeo cabinet was installed on 25 June 2018 and included Wuite as Minister Plenipotentiary of Sint Maarten. In that position, she represented Sint Maarten's cabinet in the Council of Ministers of the Kingdom of the Netherlands, which meets in The Hague. Because of that, she moved back to The Hague. She ran once again for member of Sint Maarten's parliament in the 2020 general election as the UD's third candidate, but did not receive a seat. She called the country's problems immense and particularly complex, and her campaign was described as "surprisingly substantive" for Sint Maarten standards by de Volkskrant.

On 25 September 2019, parliament passed a motion of no confidence against five cabinet ministers including Wuite. The motion's supporters were against the cabinet's decision to dissolve parliament following the downfall of the coalition government. Wuite's term ended on 19 November 2019, and she subsequently became a strategic advisor at the Ministry of Education, Culture, Youth and Sports concerned with reconstruction projects in the aftermath of Hurricane Irma.

=== House of Representatives ===
She joined the Dutch political party D66 in early 2020 and decided to run for member of the House of Representatives of the Netherlands in the 2021 general election. Wuite said during the campaign that it was necessary to renew the relations between the constituent countries of the Kingdom of the Netherlands. According to her, issues that need to be addressed are "imposed supervision, arguments over money, [...] lack of comprehension, and unilateral handling by The Hague." Being D66's twentieth candidate, she was elected and received 15,898 preference votes. Wuite was sworn in on 31 March as the body's first member of Sint Maarten descent and was her party's spokesperson for kingdom relations, art, culture, and media. She is a member of the Interparliamentary Committee on the Dutch Language Union, and she is on the Committees for Education, Culture and Science; for Foreign Affairs; for Foreign Trade and Development Cooperation (chair); and for Kingdom Relations. When the collapse of the fourth Rutte cabinet triggered a snap election in November 2023, Wuite announced she would not run for re-election.

== Other positions ==
Next to her career, Wuite served for about ten years (until 2016) on the board of the Caribbean chapter of the Prins Bernhard Cultuurfonds, a foundation providing funding for cultural activities. She was also an ambassador of the Dutch Black Achievement Month in 2019 and the foundation's chair in early 2021, and she has been working as a Caribbean scout for the Dutch Research Council since April 2020.

== Personal life ==
Upon her election to the House of Representatives, Wuite moved to Voorburg and she later relocated once more to The Hague. She has two sons.

== Electoral history ==
Electoral history of Jorien Wuite
Year	Body	Party	Pos.	Votes	Result		Ref.
Year	Body	Party	Pos.	Votes	Party seats	Individual	Ref.
2021	House of Representatives	Democrats 66	20	15,898	24	Won	
