= Gumbs cabinet =

Cabinet of Sint Maarten, 2014 to 2015

- 4th Cabinet of Sint Maarten

- Date formed: 19 December 2014
- Date dissolved: 19 November 2015

People and organisations
- Head of state: Willem-Alexander
- Head of government: Marcel Gumbs
- Member parties: United People's Party; United St. Maarten Party; Leona Marlin-Romeo; Cornelius de Weever

History
- Election: 2014 election
- Predecessor: Wescot-Williams III
- Successor: Marlin I

The Gumbs cabinet was a coalition cabinet in Sint Maarten formed by the United People's Party and independent members of Parliament Cornelius de Weever and Leona Marlin-Romeo.

The cabinet succeeded the Third Wescot-Williams cabinet following the 2014 general elections, and was installed by Governor Eugene Holiday on 19 December 2014. It fell on 30 September following a vote of non-confidence with 3 coalition party members voting in favour.

== Composition ==
The cabinet is composed as follows:

Main office-holders
Office	Name	Party	Since
Prime Minister	Marcel Gumbs	UP	19 December 2014
Minister of Housing, Physical Planning, and Environment	Marcel Gumbs (interim)	UP	19 December 2014
Minister of Housing, Physical Planning, and Environment	Claret M. Connor	UP	7 September 2015
Minister of Finance	Martinus J. Hassink		19 December 2014
Minister of Justice	Dennis L. Richardson	USP	19 December 2014
Minister of Tourism, Economic Affairs, Transport and Telecommunications	Claret M. Connor	UP	19 December 2014
Minister of Tourism, Economic Affairs, Transport and Telecommunications	Ernest Sams	^{[Note]}	7 September 2015
Minister of Healthcare, Social Development, and Labor	Rita Gumbs (interim)	UP	19 December 2014
Minister of Healthcare, Social Development, and Labor	Rafael Boasman	^{[Note]}	7 September 2015
Minister of Education, Culture, Youth, and Sports	Rita Gumbs	UP	19 December 2014
Minister Plenipotentiary of Sint Maarten	Josianne Fleming-Artsen	UP	19 December 2014

^{Note} Ernest Sams was put forward on Leona Marlin-Romeo's recommendation, while Rafael Boasman was recommended by Cornelius de Weever.
