= List of Sint Maarten leaders of government =

This is a list of Sint Maarten leaders of government, from 1631 to the present.

List of governors or kommandeurs, between 1631 and now.
Years	Name
Commander
1631–1633	Jan Claeszoon van Campen.
Spanish governors
1633–1636	Cibrian de Lizarazu.
1636–1638	Luis de Valdes.
1638–1647	Diego Guajardo Fajardo.
Commanders
14 Feb 1648 - 1650	Martin Thomas
1650–1655	Adriaen de Vos
1655–1660	Edmondt de Fosse
1667 ?	Jan Sympson ?
1672 ?	Jan Simonszoon de Buck
Governors
1672 ? - 1672	Laurent de Maynie (a French gentleman)
1672–1679	.................... First British invasion during the Third Anglo-Dutch War .
1679- ?	.... ???
1685–1689	chevalier de Rionville (French)
1690–1697	.................... Second British occupation during the Grand Alliance (League of Augsburg) war.
1699–1701	Jean Dyel du Parquet (French)
1701–1702	Louis Cacqueray de Valmenière (French)
Vice-commanders
1703 - 170x	Lucas van Beverhoudt
1705 ?	Olivier Graval
1708?- 1710	Charles Devezaen
1710–1712	François Lemaire (French)
1712–1713	Jean Buretel
1713–1718	Martinus Meyer (1st time)
1718–1720	Louis Guillaume Durepaire (French)
1720–1722	Jan de Windt Sr.
1722–1733	Martinus Meyer (2nd time)
1733–1735	Jacobus Barry
1735–1736	John Philips (1st time)
1736–1737	Pieter Hassell
1737–1746	John Philips (2nd time)
1746–1748	Jan de Weever
1748–1781	Abraham Heijliger Pzn.
3 Feb 1781 - 26 Nov 1781	......................... Third British invasion during the Fourth Anglo-Dutch War.
Governors
1781–1783	Abraham Heijliger Pzn.
1783–1784	Charles Chabert Jr.
Vice-commanders
1784–1785	Thomas Aertsen
1785–1786	John Salomons Gibbes
Commanders
1786 - Jan 1790	John Salomons Gibbes
10 Jun 1790 - 1800	Willem Hendrik Rink (1st time)
29 Apr 1795 - 1797	La Bruyère -Commissioner (French)
1797–1801	P.Ch. Dormoy -Commissioner (French)
1800–1801	Remt Folkerus Muller
1801	Bresson -Commissioner
1801 - 24 Mar 1801	Willem Hendrik Rink (2nd time)
24 Mar 1801 - 1 Dec 1802	..... Fourth British occupation during the War of the Second Coalition. (Cdt. Robert Nicholson).
1 Dec 1802 - 1807	Willem Hendrik Rink (3rd time)
1807–1810	Jan Verveer Jzn.
1810–1813	John Skinner (b. c.1750 - d. 1827)
Fifth British occupation : during the Napoleonic Wars.
1813–1814	(British) General James Alexander Farquharson (b.1775-d.1834), (1st time)
1814–1815	(British) Major General William McCaskill (b.175?-d.1815)
1815	(British) General James Alexander Farquharson (b.1775-d.1834), (2nd time)
1815	(British) Officer Francis Edden
1815–1816	(British) Lt. General Robert Douglas.
Lieutenant governors (gezaghebbers)
1816–1820	Paulus Roelof Cantz'laar (d. 1831)
1820–1840	Diederik Johannes van Romondt
1840–1849	Johannes Willem van Romondt
1849–1850	Pieter Petersen
1850–1859	Johannes Didericus Crol
1859–1860	Lucas Percival
1860–1865	Willem Hendrik Johan van Idsinga (b. 1822 - d. 1896)
1865–1866	Philogène Philippe Maillard
1866–1870	Herman François Gerardus Wagner (b. 1822 - d. 1904)
1870–1871	Robert van Romondt (acting)
1871–1883	Edouard Dénis Ernest van den Bossche (b. 1831 - d. 1908)
1883	Diederik Charles van Romondt (1st time) (acting)
1883–1885	Jan Hendrik Rudeloff Beaujon (b. 1838 - d. 1930)
1885–1889	Theophilus Georg Groebe (b. 18.. - d. 1919)
1889–1891	Jan Hero Adriaan van Daalen (b. 1842 - d. 1899)
1891–1893	Frans Johannes Olivier
1893–1894	Diederik Charles van Romondt (2nd time) (acting)
1894–1901	Joseph Möller
1901–1918	Abraham Jan Cornelis Brouwer (b. 18.. - d. 1919)
1918–1919	Frits Koenraad Thielen (acting)
1919–1920	G.J. Tijmstra (acting)
1920	A.W. de Haseth (acting)
1920–1923	J. van der Zee Rz. (acting)
1923–1927	Richard Johannes Beaujon Jr. (b. 1883 - d. 19..)
1927	C.F. Boskaljon (acting)
1927–1930	Willem Frederik Meinhardt Lampe (b. 1896 - d. 1973) (acting)
1930–1943	Johan Diderich Meiners
1943–1947	Pieter Hendrik van Leeuwen (b. 1893 - d. ....)
1947–1948	M.J. Huith (acting)
1948–1957	Johannes Christiaan Paap
1957	Walter Granville Buncamper (1st time) (acting)
1957–1958	Hendrik Anthonius Hessling (acting)
1958–1959	Walter Granville Buncamper (2nd time) (acting)
1959–1968	Jan Jacob Japa Beaujon
1968–1975	Reinier O. van Delden (acting to 1969)
1975–1981	Theodore M. Pandt (b. 1939 - d. 2017)
1981–1982	Ralph R.H. Richardson (b. 1937)
1992–1994	Wilfred Russell Voges (b. 1943)
Sep 1994 –12 Sep 2000	Dennis L. Richardson (b. 1946)
22 Sep 2000–2010	Franklyn E. Richards (b. 1950)
Governors (gouverneurs)
Oct 2010–2022	Eugene Holiday (b. 1962)
Oct 2022–present	Ajamu Baly (b. 1977)

Leaders of the government from 1954 until 2010.
Period	Name
1954–1991	DP - Claude Wathey (b. 1926 - d. 1998)
1991–1995	SPA - Edgar Hubert Lynch (b. 1952)
1995–1 Jul 1999	SPA - William Marlin (b. 1950)
1 Jul 1999–2009	DP - Sarah Wescot-Williams (b. 1956)
6 June 2009–10 October 2010	NA - William V. Marlin (b. 1950)
Party abbreviations: DP = Democratic Party; NA = National Alliance; SPA = Sint Maarten Patriotic Alliance

Prime ministers from 10 October 2010.
Period	Name
10 October 2010 - 19 December 2014	DP - Sarah Wescot-Williams (b. 1956)
19 December 2014 - 19 November 2015	UPP - Marcel Gumbs (b. 1953).
19 November 2015 - 24 November 2017	NA - William Marlin (b. 1950)
24 November 2017 - 15 January 2018	USP - Rafael Boasman (b. 1953)
15 January 2018 - 10 October 2019	UD - Leona Marlin-Romeo (b. 1973)
10 October 2019 - 19 November 2019	SMCP - Wycliffe Smith (b. 1948)
19 November 2019 - 3 May 2024	NA - Silveria Jacobs (b. 1968)
3 May 2024 - present	URSM - Luc Mercelina (b. 1964)
Party abbreviations: DP = Democratic Party; NA = National Alliance; SMCP = Sint Maarten Christian Party; UPP = United People's Party; UD = United Democrats; USP = United St. Maarten Party; URSM = Unified Resilient St. Maarten Movement

== See also ==
- Saint Martin (island), the Caribbean island
  - The French side of the island
- Culture of St. Martin, the Caribbean island
- History of St. Martin, the Caribbean island
- O sweet Saint-Martin's Land (bi-national song/anthem of Saint-Martin/Sint-Maarten )
