= First Marlin-Romeo cabinet =

Cabinet of Sint Maarten in 2018

- 7th cabinet of Sint Maarten
- Date formed: 15 January 2018
- Date dissolved: 25 June 2018 (161 days in office)

People and organisations
- Monarch: King Willem-Alexander
- Governor: Eugene Holiday
- Head of government: Leona Marlin-Romeo
- No. of ministers: 7
- Member parties: United Democrats (UD): United People's Party (UP); Democratic Party (DP); Chanel Brownbill
- Status in legislature: Majority

History
- Outgoing election: 2018 election
- Predecessor: Second Marlin cabinet
- Successor: Second Marlin-Romeo cabinet

The first Marlin-Romeo cabinet was the seventh cabinet of Sint Maarten. It was a caretaker government formed by the United Democrats – a merger of the United People's Party (5 seats) and the Democratic Party (2 seats), which was joined by the independent Member of Parliament Chanel Brownbill. The cabinet was installed by Governor Eugene Holiday on 15 January 2018 and was led by Prime Minister Leona Marlin-Romeo.

The caretaker government was formed following the collapse of the second Marlin cabinet in November 2017, when the Democratic Party and Chanel Brownbill (USP) pulled their support from the National Alliance-led coalition.

== Composition ==
Ministers in the first Marlin-Romeo cabinet
Title	Minister		Term of office		Party
Title	Minister		Start	End	Party
Prime Minister and Minister of General Affairs	Leona Marlin-Romeo	Leona Marlin-Romeo	15 January 2018	25 June 2018	UD
Minister of Finance	Michael Ferrier	Michael Ferrier	15 January 2018	25 June 2018	UD
Minister of Education, Culture, Youth and Sport	Jorien Wuite	Jorien Wuite	15 January 2018	25 June 2018	UD
Minister of Justice	Cornelius de Weever	Cornelius de Weever	15 January 2018	25 June 2018	UD
Minister of Public Health, Social Development and Labor	Emil Lee	Emil Lee	15 January 2018	25 June 2018	UD
Minister of Tourism, Economic Affairs, Transport and Telecommunication	Cornelius de Weever	Cornelius de Weever (ad interim)	15 January 2018	25 June 2018	UD
Minister of Public Housing, Spatial Planning, Environment and Infrastructure	Miklos Gitterson	Miklos Gitterson	15 January 2018	25 June 2018	UD
Deputy Minister Plenipotentiary (Note: Not formally a member of the cabinet.)	Hasani Ellis	Hasani Ellis	15 January 2018	25 June 2018	UD
