= First Jacobs cabinet =

Cabinet of Sint Maarten, 2019 to 2020

Jacobs cabinet
- 9th Cabinet of Sint Maarten
- Date formed: 19 November 2019
- Date dissolved: 28 March 2020

People and organisations
- Head of state: Willem-Alexander
- Head of government: Silveria Jacobs

History
- Outgoing election: 2020 election
- Predecessor: Marlin-Romeo II
- Successor: Jacobs II

The Jacobs cabinet was the 9th cabinet of Sint Maarten. It was part of the executive branch of the Sint Maarten Government and was formed by members of the National Alliance and the United St. Maarten Party. It was followed by the second Jacobs cabinet installed after the 2020 snap general election.

The cabinet was formed following the collapse of the Second Marlin-Romeo cabinet in September 2019, when Franklin Meyers, faction leader of the United Democrats, left his party to become an independent member of parliament. On 22 September 2019, UD members of parliament, Luc Mercelina and Chanel Brownbill, followed suit.

It was installed by Governor Eugene Holiday on 19 November 2019.

== Composition ==
The cabinet is composed as follows:

Main office-holders
Office	Name	Party	Since
Prime Minister	Silveria Jacobs	NA	19 November 2019
Minister of Housing, Physical Planning, and Environment	Christopher Wever		19 November 2019
Minister of Finance	Ardwell Irion	NA	19 November 2019
Minister of Justice	Egbert Doran	NA	19 November 2019
Minister of Education, Culture, Youth, and Sports	Ardwell Irion	NA	19 November 2019
Minister of Tourism, Economic Affairs, Transport and Telecommunications	Rene Violenes (interim)	NA	19 November 2019
Minister of Tourism, Economic Affairs, Transport and Telecommunications	Mellissa Arrindell-Doncher	USP	28 November 2019
Minister of Healthcare, Social Development, and Labor	Egbert Doran (interim)	NA	19 November 2019
Minister of Healthcare, Social Development, and Labor	Pamela Gordon-Lake	USP	28 November 2019
Minister Plenipotentiary of Sint Maarten	Silveria Jacobs (interim)	NA	19 November 2019
Minister Plenipotentiary of Sint Maarten	Rene Violenes	NA	28 November 2019
