= First Mercelina cabinet =

Cabinet of Sint Maarten in 2024

Mercelina cabinet
- 11th Cabinet of Sint Maarten
- Date formed: 3 May 2024
- Date dissolved: 21 May 2024

People and organisations
- Head of state: Willem-Alexander (Monarch); Ajamu Baly (Governor)
- Head of government: Luc Mercelina
- Member parties: Unified Resilient St. Maarten Movement, Democratic Party, Party for Progress, Nation Opportunity Wealth

History
- Election: 11 January 2024
- Predecessor: Jacobs II
- Successor: Mercelina II

The Mercelina cabinet was the 11th Council of Ministers of Sint Maarten headed by Prime Minister Luc Mercelina. It was installed by Governor Ajamu Baly on 3 May 2024.

Formation of the cabinet began after the general elections held on 11 January 2024. The cabinet is a coalition of four parties known as the 2x4 coalition: Unified Resilient St. Maarten Movement, Democratic Party, Party for Progress, Nation Opportunity Wealth. The cabinet fell after only 18 days when Nation Opportunity Wealth MP Kevin Maingrette resigned from his party and left the coalition to join the opposition. This crossing the floor cost the coalition its majority, leading Mercelina to dissolve parliament and call snap elections. However, on 27 May, Maingrette withdrew his support for the opposition and expressed support for the Mercelina administration again despite still sitting as an independent. However, the elections remained scheduled.

== List of Ministers ==
The cabinet is composed as follows:

Unified Resilient St. Maarten Movement (URSM) Democratic Party (DP) Party for Progress (Sint Maarten) (PFP) Nation Opportunity Wealth (N.O.W.)

| Portfolio | Minister | Took office | Left office | Party | Remarks |
|---|---|---|---|---|---|
| Prime Minister; Minister of General Affairs | Luc Mercelina | 3 May 2024 | Incumbent | URSM | |
| Deputy Prime Minister; Minister of Public Health, Social Development and Labour (VSA); Acting Minister of Public Housing, Spatial Planning, Environment and Infrastructure | Veronica Jansen-Webster | 3 May 2024 | Incumbent | URSM | |
| Minister of Justice; Acting Minister of Education, Culture, Youth and Sports (ECYS) | Lyndon Lewis | 3 May 2024 | Incumbent | N.O.W. | |
| Minister of Finance | Marinka Gumbs | 3 May 2024 | Incumbent | DP | |
| Minister of Tourism, Economic Affairs, Transport and Telecommunication | Grisha Heyliger-Marten | 3 May 2024 | Incumbent | DP | Current member of parliament |
| Minister Plenipotentiary | Patrice Gumbs | 3 May 2024 | Incumbent | PFP | |
| Acting Minister Plenipotentiary | Gracita Arrindell | 3 May 2024 | Incumbent | URSM | |
