= Prime Minister of Sint Maarten =

Head of government of Sint Maarten

- Minister-president van Sint Maarten (Dutch)
- Flag of Sint Maarten

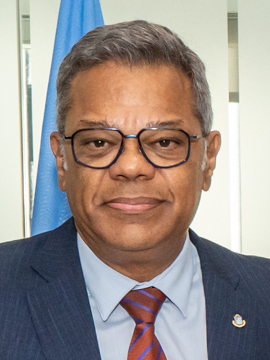
- Incumbent; Luc Mercelina since 3 May 2024
- Type: Head of government
- Appointer: Governor of Sint Maarten
- Precursor: Prime Minister of the Netherlands Antilles
- Formation: 10 October 2010; 15 years ago
- First holder: Sarah Wescot-Williams

The prime minister of Sint Maarten (Dutch: Minister-president van Sint Maarten) became the head of government of Sint Maarten after the Netherlands Antilles had been dissolved on 10 October 2010. The prime minister, together with the Council of Ministers and the governor of Sint Maarten, form the executive branch of the government of Sint Maarten. Sint Maarten's current prime minister is Luc Mercelina.

== List of prime ministers ==
Political parties:

DP UPP NA USP UD SMCP URSM

No.	Portrait	Name (Birth–Death)	Term of office			Political party	Election	Government		Governor (term)	Monarch(s) (reign)	Ref.
No.	Portrait	Name (Birth–Death)	Took office	Left office	Time in office	Political party	Election	Name	Composition	Governor (term)	Monarch(s) (reign)	Ref.
1	Sarah Wescot-Williams	Sarah Wescot-Williams (born 1956)	10 October 2010	19 December 2014	4 years, 70 days	Democratic Party (DP)	2010	Wescot-Williams I	DP – UPP	Eugene Holiday (2010–2022)	Beatrix r. 1980–2013	
1	Sarah Wescot-Williams	Sarah Wescot-Williams (born 1956)	10 October 2010	19 December 2014	4 years, 70 days	Democratic Party (DP)	—	Wescot-Williams II	DP – NA – Ind.	Eugene Holiday (2010–2022)	Beatrix r. 1980–2013	
1	Sarah Wescot-Williams	Sarah Wescot-Williams (born 1956)	10 October 2010	19 December 2014	4 years, 70 days	Democratic Party (DP)	—	Wescot-Williams III	DP – NA – Ind.	Eugene Holiday (2010–2022)	Willem-Alexander r. 2013–present	
2	Marcel Gumbs	Marcel Gumbs (born 1953)	19 December 2014	19 November 2015	335 days	United People's Party (UPP)	2014	Gumbs	UPP – USP – Ind.	Eugene Holiday (2010–2022)	Willem-Alexander r. 2013–present	
3	William Marlin	William Marlin (born 1950)	19 November 2015	24 November 2017	2 years, 5 days	National Alliance (NA)	—	Marlin I	NA – DP – USP – Ind.	Eugene Holiday (2010–2022)	Willem-Alexander r. 2013–present	
3	William Marlin	William Marlin (born 1950)	19 November 2015	24 November 2017	2 years, 5 days	National Alliance (NA)	2016	Marlin II	NA – USP – DP	Eugene Holiday (2010–2022)	Willem-Alexander r. 2013–present	
4	Rafael Boasman	Rafael Boasman (born 1953)	24 November 2017	15 January 2018	52 days	United St. Maarten Party (USP)	—	Marlin II	NA – USP – DP	Eugene Holiday (2010–2022)	Willem-Alexander r. 2013–present	
5	Leona Marlin-Romeo	Leona Marlin-Romeo (born 1973)	15 January 2018	10 October 2019	1 year, 268 days	United Democrats (UD)	—	Marlin-Romeo I	UD – Ind.	Eugene Holiday (2010–2022)	Willem-Alexander r. 2013–present	
5	Leona Marlin-Romeo	Leona Marlin-Romeo (born 1973)	15 January 2018	10 October 2019	1 year, 268 days	United Democrats (UD)	2018	Marlin-Romeo II	UD – SMCP	Eugene Holiday (2010–2022)	Willem-Alexander r. 2013–present	
6	Wycliffe Smith	Wycliffe Smith (born 1948)	10 October 2019	19 November 2019	40 days	Sint Maarten Christian Party (SMCP)	—	Marlin-Romeo II	UD – SMCP	Eugene Holiday (2010–2022)	Willem-Alexander r. 2013–present	
7	Silveria Jacobs	Silveria Jacobs (born 1968)	19 November 2019	3 May 2024	4 years, 166 days	National Alliance (NA)	—	Jacobs I	NA – USP	Eugene Holiday (2010–2022)	Willem-Alexander r. 2013–present	
7	Silveria Jacobs	Silveria Jacobs (born 1968)	19 November 2019	3 May 2024	4 years, 166 days	National Alliance (NA)	2020	Jacobs II	NA – UPP	Ajamu Baly (2022–present)	Willem-Alexander r. 2013–present	
8	Luc Mercelina	Luc Mercelina (born 1964)	3 May 2024	Incumbent	2 years, 127 days	Unified Resilient St. Maarten Movement (URSM)	Jan. 2024	Mercelina I	URSM – DP – PFP – NOW	Ajamu Baly (2022–present)	Willem-Alexander r. 2013–present	
8	Luc Mercelina	Luc Mercelina (born 1964)	3 May 2024	Incumbent	2 years, 127 days	Unified Resilient St. Maarten Movement (URSM)	Aug. 2024	Mercelina II	URSM – DP – PFP – NOW	Ajamu Baly (2022–present)	Willem-Alexander r. 2013–present	

== Timeline ==
This is a graphical lifespan timeline of prime ministers of Sint Maarten. They are listed in order of first assuming office.

== See also ==
- List of Sint Maarten leaders of government
