= Second Jacobs cabinet =

Cabinet of Sint Maarten, 2020 to 2024

Jacobs cabinet
- 10th Cabinet of Sint Maarten
- Date formed: 28 March 2020
- Date dissolved: 3 May 2024

People and organisations
- Head of state: Willem-Alexander
- Head of government: Silveria Jacobs

History
- Predecessor: Jacobs I
- Successor: Mercelina I

The second Jacobs cabinet was the 10th cabinet of Sint Maarten. It was installed by Governor Eugene Holiday on 28 March 2020.

Formation of the cabinet began after the 2020 Sint Maarten general election held on 9 January 2020.

== Composition ==
The cabinet was composed as follows:

Main office-holders
Office	Name	Party	Since
Prime Minister	Silveria Jacobs	National Alliance (NA)	28 March 2020
Minister of Public Housing, Spatial Planning, Environment and Infrastructure	Egbert Doran	NA	28 March 2020
Minister of Finance	Ardwell Irion	NA	28 March 2020
Minister of Justice	Anna Richardson	NA	28 March 2020
Minister of Education, Culture, Youth, and Sports	Rodolphe Samuel	NA	28 March 2020
Minister of Tourism, Economic Affairs, Transport and Telecommunications	Ludmila de Weever	United People's Party (UP)	28 March 2020
Minister of Public Health, Social Development and Labour	Richard Panneflek	UP	28 March 2020
Minister Plenipotentiary of Sint Maarten	Rene Violenes	NA	28 March 2020
