= Third Wescot-Williams cabinet =

Cabinet of Sint Maarten, 2013 to 2014

- 3rd Cabinet of Sint Maarten

- Date formed: 14 June 2013
- Date dissolved: 9 September 2014 (Replaced on 19 December 2014)

People and organisations
- Head of state: Willem-Alexander
- Head of government: Sarah Wescot-Williams
- Member parties: Democratic Party (DP); United People's Party (UP); Romain Laville

History
- Election: N/A
- Outgoing election: 2014 election
- Predecessor: Wescot-Williams II
- Successor: Gumbs

The third Wescot-Williams cabinet was the third Cabinet of Sint Maarten installed following the achievement of constituent country status of Sint Maarten within the Kingdom of the Netherlands on 10 October 2010. The cabinet was a coalition between the United People's Party, the Democratic Party, and independent member of parliament Romain Laville.

The cabinet was formed following the collapse of the Second Wescot-Williams cabinet in May 2013, when the two Democratic Party MPs and Romain Laville pulled their support from National Alliance led government.

== Composition ==
The cabinet was composed as follows:

Main office-holders
Office	Name	Party	Since
Prime Minister	Sarah Wescot-Williams	DP	14 June 2013
Minister of Housing, Physical Planning, and Environment	Maurice A. Lake	UP	14 June 2013
Minister of Finance	Martinus J. Hassink		14 June 2013
Minister of Justice	Dennis L. Richardson		14 June 2013
Minister of Tourism, Economic Affairs, Transport and Telecommunications	Sarah Wescot-Williams (interim)	DP	14 June 2013
Minister of Tourism, Economic Affairs, Transport and Telecommunications	Thadeus Richardson		25 July 2013
Minister of Healthcare, Social Development, and Labor	Cornelius de Weever	DP	14 June 2013
Minister of Education, Culture, Youth, and Sports	Patricia D. Lourens-Philip	UP	14 June 2013
Minister Plenipotentiary of Sint Maarten	Mathias Voges	DP	14 June 2013
Deputy Minister Plenipotentiary of Sint Maarten	Josianne Fleming-Artsen	UP	25 July 2013
