= President of the Parliament of Sint Maarten =

The president of the Parliament of Sint Maarten (Dutch: Voorzitter van Staten van Sint Maarten) is the presiding officer of the Parliament of Sint Maarten. According to Article 8 of the Rules of Order of Parliament the president presides over the sittings of the House and enforces the rules prescribed in the Rules of Order of Parliament for the orderly conduct of parliamentary business. The president is supported by a team of vice presidents, divided into a first vice president and second vice president, who are also members of the House. In the event that the president is unable to lead a meeting the meeting is chaired by the first vice president.

== List of presidents ==
The following table lists the presidents of the Parliament of Sint Maarten that have been in office since Sint Maarten became a country in the Kingdom of the Netherlands on 10 October 2010:

#	Name	Took office	Left office	Party
1	Gracita Arrindell	10 October 2010	14 July 2012	UP
2	Rodolphe E. Samuel	15 July 2012	24 May 2013	NA
3	Gracita Arrindell	24 June 2013	9 October 2014	UP
4	Sarah Wescot-Williams	10 October 2014	13 November 2014	DP
5	Lloyd Richardson	1 December 2014	12 October 2015	UP
6	Sarah Wescot-Williams	15 October 2015	31 October 2016	DP
7	Claret M. Connor	31 October 2016	24 November 2016	UP
8	Sarah Wescot-Williams	24 November 2016	22 September 2019	DP, UD
9	William Marlin	25 September 2019	10 February 2020	NA
10	Rolando Brison	10 February 2020	4 November 2021	UPP
11	Grisha Heyliger-Marten	26 November 2021	27 October 2022	UPP
12	Sidharth M. Bijlani	30 November 2022	10 February 2024	UPP
13	Sarah Wescot-Williams	2024	Incumbent	UD

== See also ==
- List of Sint Maarten leaders of government
