= Governor of Sint Maarten =

Governor's standard

The governor of Sint Maarten is the representative on Sint Maarten of the Dutch head of state (King Willem-Alexander). The governor exercises constitutional power, on behalf of the Dutch monarch within the territory.

== Duties ==
The governor's duties are twofold: he represents and guards the general interests of the kingdom and is head of the government of Sint Maarten. He is accountable to the government of the Kingdom of the Netherlands. As the head of the government, the governor is immune. The governor exercises the executive power under the responsibility of the ministers, who are responsible to the Estates of Sint Maarten. The governor does not have political responsibilities and is not part of the cabinet. During the formation of a cabinet the governor plays an important role. The governor is appointed by the monarch for a period of six years. This period can be prolonged for one more term of six years. The governor is supported by his secretariat the cabinet of the governor, and is advised by the Council of Advice (Raad van Advies), consisting of at least five members, appointed by the governor, advising him on the drafts of state ordinances, state decrees, kingdom acts and general administrative orders.

In 2026, a minor constitutional crisis involving the governor came to light. In January, it emerged that Governor Baly had interfered in the disciplinary process for Sint Maartenian civil servants by taking part in deliberations and excluding ministers from discussion, apparently in breach of the Governor's usual role as neutral representative of the Crown with him delaying assent to the disciplinary decision. In March 2026, a paper was circulated to examine the governor's role in the territory. A subsequent court case upheld the governor's authority over all legal and constitutional matters.

== List of governors ==
On 10 October 2010, Sint Maarten attained the status of a separate country within the Kingdom of the Netherlands (status aparte). Until the dissolution of the Netherlands Antilles, the governor of the Netherlands Antilles was also responsible for Sint Maarten. The first governor of Sint Maarten was Eugene Holiday, followed by Ajamu Baly.

No.	Governor		Took office	Left office	Prime Ministers	Monarch (reign)
1	Portrait of Eugene Holiday	Eugene Holiday (born 1962)	10 October 2010	10 October 2022	Wescot-Williams; Gumbs; Marlin; Boasman; Marlin-Romeo; Smith; Jacobs	Beatrix r. 1980–2013
1	Portrait of Eugene Holiday	Eugene Holiday (born 1962)	10 October 2010	10 October 2022	Wescot-Williams; Gumbs; Marlin; Boasman; Marlin-Romeo; Smith; Jacobs	Willem-Alexander r. 2013–present
2		Ajamu Baly (born 1977)	10 October 2022	Incumbent	Jacobs; Mercelina	Willem-Alexander r. 2013–present

== See also ==
- Kingdom of the Netherlands
