= 2018 Sint Maarten general election =

- 26 February 2018
- All 15 seats in Parliament; 8 seats needed for a majority
- Turnout: 62.18% (▼3.27pp)
Party	Leader	Vote %	Seats	+/–
UD	Sarah Wescot-Williams	42.40	7	0
NA	Silveria Jacobs	30.51	5	0
USP	Frans Richardson	13.20	2	−1
SMCP	Wycliffe Smith	8.72	1	+1
This lists parties that won seats. See the complete results below.
Prime Minister before	Prime Minister after
Rafael Boasman; USP	Leona Marlin-Romeo; UD

Snap general elections were held in Sint Maarten on 26 February 2018 following a no confidence vote in the Second Marlin cabinet.

== Background ==
In November 2017, a motion of no confidence against Prime Minister William Marlin and some other ministers was accepted in Parliament, due to Marlin's position in the negotiation with the Dutch government about anti fraud measures and aid funds in the aftermath of Hurricanes Irma and Maria. After the motion of no confidence was accepted, Marlin tendered the resignation of his cabinet to governor Eugene Holiday and requested elections to be held. It is the second early election in a row since the Gumbs cabinet fell in 2015.

== Electoral system ==
The 15 seats in the Estates were elected by proportional representation. In order to participate in the election, new parties and parties without a seat in parliament were required to obtain at least 142 signatures; 1% of the valid votes of the 2016 parliamentary elections.

== Results ==
Party	Votes	%	Seats	+/–
United Democrats	5,769	42.40	7	0
National Alliance	4,152	30.51	5	0
United St. Maarten Party	1,796	13.20	2	–1
St. Maarten Christian Party	1,186	8.72	1	+1
St. Maarten Development Movement	419	3.08	0	0
People's Progressive Alliance	285	2.09	0	0
Total	13,607	100.00	15	0
Valid votes	13,607	97.01		
Invalid votes	323	2.30		
Blank votes	97	0.69		
Total votes	14,027	100.00		
Registered voters/turnout	22,557	62.18		
Source: Government of Sint Maarten
