= Ministry of Justice (Sint Maarten) =

Sint Maarten Government Department

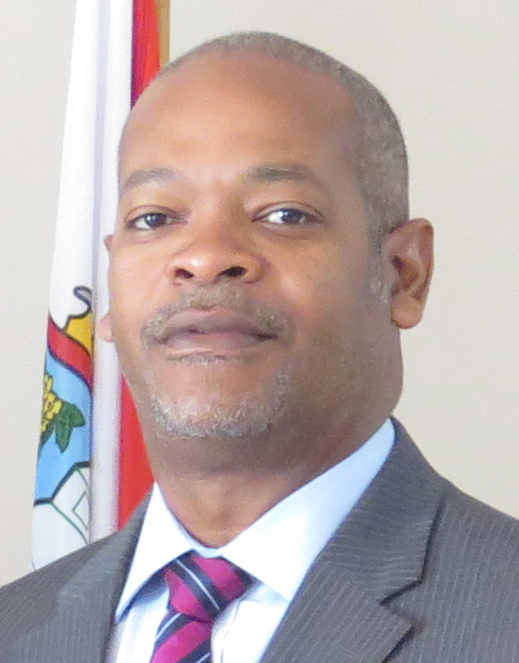
Former Minister of Justice Cornelius De Weever

The Ministry of Justice of Sint Maarten oversees public safety, law and order, and the upholding of justice in Sint Maarten. The ministry is responsible for the following agencies:

- Immigration and Border Protection Service
- Police Corps of St. Maarten
- Customs
- Prison and House of Detention
- Financial Intelligence Unit
- Internal Services

Also, the following organizations fall within the justice sector and report to the Minister of Justice:

- Coast Guard
- Court of Guardianship
- Judicial Facilities Foundation (Probation & Family Supervision)
- Youth Correctional Foundation

== List of ministers of justice ==
#	Name	Took office	Left office	Party	Cabinet
1	Roland Duncan	10 October 2010	4 June 2013	UP	Wescot-Williams I
1	Roland Duncan	10 October 2010	4 June 2013	UP	Wescot-Williams II
2	Dennis Richardson	14 June 2013	19 November 2015	USP	Wescot-Williams III
2	Dennis Richardson	14 June 2013	19 November 2015	USP	Gumbs
interim	Richard Gibson	19 November 2015	26 January 2016	NA	Marlin I
3	Edson Kirindongo	26 January 2016	20 December 2016	USP	Marlin I
4	Rafael Boasman	20 December 2016	15 January 2018	USP	Marlin II
5	Cornelius De Weever	15 January 2018		UD	Marlin-Romeo I
5	Cornelius De Weever	15 January 2018		UD	Marlin-Romeo II
6	Egbert Doran	19 November 2019	28 March 2020	NA	Jacobs I
7	Anna Richardson	28 March 2020	3 May 2024	NA	Jacobs II
8	Lyndon Lewis	3 May 2024	Incumbent	N.O.W.	Mercelina I

== See also ==
- Justice ministry
- Politics of Sint Maarten
