= Second Marlin cabinet =

Cabinet of Sint Maarten, 2016 to 2018

- 6th Cabinet of Sint Maarten

- Date formed: 20 December 2016
- Date dissolved: 15 January 2018

People and organisations
- Head of state: Willem-Alexander
- Head of government: William Marlin; Rafael Boasman
- Member parties: National Alliance (NA); United St. Maarten Party (USP); Democratic Party (DP)

History
- Election: 2016 election
- Predecessor: Marlin I
- Successor: Marlin-Romeo I

The Second Marlin cabinet was the sixth Cabinet of Sint Maarten installed following the achievement of constituent country status of Sint Maarten within the Kingdom of the Netherlands on 10 October 2010. The cabinet was a coalition between the National Alliance, the United St. Maarten Party and the Democratic Party.

== Irma and aftermath ==
After hurricane Irma hit the island in September 2017, most of the houses on the island were destroyed. While the French part of the island is part of the European Union, the Dutch part is not - and therefore Sint Maarten could not make use of European emergency funds, and was dependent on Dutch aid. The Dutch government made 550 million euro available, but demanded the institution of anti-fraud measures as was already previously agreed with the Sint Maarten government before the aid would be made available. Marlin refused to implement some of those measures though, and this led on November 2 to a motion of no confidence in the Sint Maarten parliament for Marlin and some of his ministers.

After the motion of no confidence was accepted, Marlin tendered the resignation of the cabinet to governor Eugene Holiday and requested elections to be held. As customary, Marlin would lead a caretaker cabinet until a new cabinet would be appointed. However on November 10, another motion of no confidence was accepted in parliament, demanding that Marlin immediately stepped aside. Marlin refused, which led to the Dutch Kingdom Council of Ministers to issue an instruction to the governor to accept the resignation of Marlin as prime minister, and appoint the deputy prime minister Rafael Boasman as his replacement. This was executed by the governor on November 24. The remaining cabinet will continue as caretaker cabinet until the elections early 2018.

After the excusing of Marlin, the cabinet started implementing the demanded measures by the Dutch government, which allowed the transfer of aid funds. The aid funds are mostly distributed through international organizations, such as the World Bank.

== Composition ==
The cabinet is composed as follows:

Main office-holders
Office	Name	Party	Since
Prime Minister	William Marlin	NA	20 December 2016
Prime Minister	Rafael Boasman	USP	24 November 2017
Minister of Housing, Physical Planning, and Environment	Christophe Emmanuel	NA	20 December 2016
Minister of Finance	Richard Gibson	NA	20 December 2016
Minister of Justice	Rafael Boasman	USP	20 December 2016
Minister of Tourism, Economic Affairs, Transport and Telecommunications	Rafael Boasman (interim)	USP	20 December 2016
Minister of Tourism, Economic Affairs, Transport and Telecommunications	Mellissa Arrindell-Doncher	USP	4 April 2017
Minister of Healthcare, Social Development, and Labor	Emil Lee	DP	20 December 2016
Minister of Education, Culture, Youth, and Sports	Silveria Jacobs	NA	20 December 2016
Minister Plenipotentiary of Sint Maarten	Henrietta Doran-York	NA	20 December 2016
Deputy Minister Plenipotentiary of Sint Maarten	Hasani Ellis	DP	20 December 2016
