= First Wescot-Williams cabinet =

Cabinet of Sint Maarten, 2010 to 2012

- 1st Cabinet of Sint Maarten
- Date formed: 10 October 2010
- Date dissolved: 30 April 2012 (Replaced on 21 May 2012)

People and organisations
- Head of state: Beatrix of the Netherlands
- Head of government: Sarah Wescot-Williams
- Member parties: Democratic Party (DP); United People's Party (UP)

History
- Election: 2010 election
- Outgoing election: N/A
- Predecessor: N/A
- Successor: Wescot-Williams II

The First Wescot-Williams cabinet was the first Cabinet of Sint Maarten installed following the achievement of constituent country status of Sint Maarten within the Kingdom of the Netherlands on 10 October 2010. Government formation followed the September 2010 Sint Maarten general election, which saw the National Alliance emerge as the largest party. Nevertheless, the coalition was formed by the Democratic Party and the United Peoples party. Despite only winning two seats, the office of Prime Minister was delivered by DP's head Sarah Wescot-Williams.

The coalition collapsed in April 2012 after United Peoples faction leader Romain Laville left his party and became an independent member of parliament. The cabinet lost its majority and tabled its resignation with the governor. The cabinet was succeeded by the second Wescot-Williams cabinet on 21 May 2012.

== Composition ==
The cabinet was composed as follows:

Main office-holders
Office	Name	Party	Since
Prime Minister	Sarah Wescot-Williams	DP	10 October 2010
Deputy Prime Minister and Minister of Housing, Physical Planning, and Environment	Theodore Heyliger	UP	10 October 2010
Minister of Finance	Hiro Shigemoto	UP	10 October 2010
Minister of Justice	Roland Duncan	UP	10 October 2010
Minister of Tourism, Economic Affairs, Transport and Telecommunications	Franklin Meyers	UP	10 October 2010
Minister of Healthcare, Social Development, and Labor	Maria Buncamper-Molanus	DP	10 October 2010
Minister of Healthcare, Social Development, and Labor	Sarah Wescot-Williams (interim)	DP	23 December 2010
Minister of Healthcare, Social Development, and Labor	Cornelius de Weever	DP	10 March 2011
Minister of Education, Culture, Youth, and Sports	Rhoda Arrindell	UP	10 October 2010
Minister Plenipotentiary of Sint Maarten	Mathias Voges	DP	10 October 2010
