= Marlin cabinet =

Marlin cabinet may refer to:

- First Marlin cabinet, the cabinet of Sint Maarten under Prime Minister William Marlin, 2015–2016
- Second Marlin cabinet, the cabinet of Sint Maarten under Prime Ministers William Marlin and Rafael Boasman, 2016–2018
- First Marlin-Romeo cabinet, the cabinet of Sint Maarten under Prime Minister Leona Marlin-Romeo, 2018
- Second Marlin-Romeo cabinet, the current Sint Maarten cabinet, since 25 June 2018
