= Second Marlin-Romeo cabinet =

Cabinet of Sint Maarten, 2018 to 2019

- 8th cabinet of Sint Maarten
- Date formed: 25 June 2018
- Date dissolved: 19 November 2019 (1 year, 147 days in office)

People and organisations
- Monarch: King Willem-Alexander
- Governor: Eugene Holiday
- Head of government: Leona Marlin-Romeo (2018–2019); Wycliffe Smith (2019)
- No. of ministers: 7
- Member parties: United Democrats (UD); St. Maarten Christian Party (SMCP)

History
- Election: 2018 election
- Predecessor: First Marlin-Romeo cabinet
- Successor: First Jacobs cabinet

The second Marlin-Romeo cabinet was the 8th cabinet of Sint Maarten. It was formed by a coalition of the political parties United Democrats (UD) and the St. Maarten Christian Party (SMCP).

The cabinet succeeded the first Marlin-Romeo cabinet following the 2018 general election, and was installed by Governor Eugene Holiday on 25 June 2018. The cabinet lost its majority on 9 September 2019 when Franklin Meyers, faction leader of the UD, left his party to become an independent Member of Parliament. On 22 September 2019, UD Members of Parliament Luc Mercelina and Chanel Brownbill followed suit, which led to the collapse of the second Marlin-Romeo cabinet.

== Composition ==
Ministers in the first Marlin-Romeo cabinet
Title	Minister		Term of office		Party
Title	Minister		Start	End	Party
Prime Minister and Minister of General Affairs	Leona Marlin-Romeo	Leona Marlin-Romeo	25 June 2018	10 October 2019 (Note: Resigned from this position.)	UD
Prime Minister and Minister of General Affairs	Wycliffe Smith	Wycliffe Smith	10 October 2019	19 November 2019	SMCP
Minister of Finance	Perry Geerlings	Perry Geerlings	25 June 2018	19 November 2019	UD
Minister of Education, Culture, Youth and Sport	Wycliffe Smith	Wycliffe Smith	25 June 2018	19 November 2019	SMCP
Minister of Justice	Cornelius de Weever	Cornelius de Weever	25 June 2018	10 October 2019	UD
Minister of Justice	Perry Geerlings	Perry Geerlings	10 October 2019	19 November 2019	UD
Minister of Public Health, Social Development and Labor	Emil Lee	Emil Lee	25 June 2018	2 July 2019	UD
Minister of Public Health, Social Development and Labor	Christopher Wever	Christopher Wever	10 October 2019	19 November 2019	UD
Minister of Tourism, Economic Affairs, Transport and Telecommunication	Stuart Johnson	Stuart Johnson	25 June 2018	19 November 2019	UD
Minister of Public Housing, Spatial Planning, Environment and Infrastructure	Miklos Gitterson	Miklos Gitterson	25 June 2018	30 August 2019	UD
Minister of Public Housing, Spatial Planning, Environment and Infrastructure	Christopher Wever	Christopher Wever	30 August 2019	19 November 2019	UD
Minister Plenipotentiary (Note: Not formally a member of the cabinet.)	Jorien Wuite	Jorien Wuite	25 June 2018	19 November 2019	UD
Deputy Minister Plenipotentiary	Michael Somersall	Michael Somersall	25 June 2018	19 November 2019	SMCP
