= Second Wescot-Williams cabinet =

Cabinet of Sint Maarten, 2012 to 2013

- 2nd Cabinet of Sint Maarten

- Date formed: 21 May 2012
- Date dissolved: 5 May 2013 (Replaced on 4 June 2013)

People and organisations
- Head of state: Beatrix; Willem-Alexander (2013-)
- Head of government: Sarah Wescot-Williams
- Member parties: Democratic Party (DP); National Alliance (NA); Frans Richardson; Patrick Illidge; Romain Laville

History
- Predecessor: Wescot-Williams I
- Successor: Wescot-Williams III

The second Wescot-Williams cabinet was the second Cabinet of Sint Maarten installed following the achievement of constituent country status of Sint Maarten within the Kingdom of the Netherlands on 10 October 2010. The cabinet was a coalition between the National Alliance and the Democratic Party, the latter party delivering the Prime Minister despite being the junior partner in the coalition.

The cabinet was formed following the collapse of the first Wescot-Williams cabinet in April 2012, when United Peoples faction leader Romain Laville left his party and became an independent member of parliament. A coalition agreement between the National Alliance and the Democratic Party and I3, consisting of independent MPs Frans Richardson, Patrick Illidge and Romain Laville, was signed on 11 May 2012, and a new cabinet was installed on 21 May 2012.

== Composition ==
The cabinet was composed as follows:

Main office-holders
Office	Name	Party	Since
Prime Minister	Sarah Wescot-Williams	DP	21 May 2012
Deputy Prime Minister and Minister of Housing, Physical Planning, and Environment	William Marlin	NA	21 May 2012
Minister of Finance	Roland Tuitt	NA	21 May 2012
Minister of Justice	Roland Duncan		21 May 2012
Minister of Tourism, Economic Affairs, Transport and Telecommunications	Romeo Pantophlet	NA	21 May 2012
Minister of Healthcare, Social Development, and Labor	Cornelius de Weever	DP	21 May 2012
Minister of Education, Culture, Youth, and Sports	Silveria Jacobs	NA	21 May 2012
Minister Plenipotentiary of Sint Maarten	Mathias Voges	DP	21 May 2012
Deputy Minister Plenipotentiary of Sint Maarten	Henrietta Doran-York	NA	21 May 2012
