= Melissa Gumbs =

Sint Maarten politician (born 1983)

Member of the Parliament of Sint Maarten
- Incumbent
- Assumed office 10 February 2020

Personal details
- Born: 4 September 1983 (age 42) Sint Maarten
- Party: Party for Progress

Melissa Gumbs (born 4 September 1983) is a Sint Maarten politician and has been a member of the Parliament of Sint Maarten since 2020.

== Background ==
Melissa Gumbs is the daughter of Marcel Gumbs, former politician and the 2nd Prime Minister of Sint Maarten. Gumbs grew up in Sint Maarten. At the end of 2006, she obtained a master's degree in international business administration from St. Thomas University. After moving to the Netherlands, Gumbs worked at TMF Group from 2010 to 2015 as a market research analyst. During this period she was co-founder and chairman of Unified Sint Maarten Connection (USC), a youth organization that aimed to connect St. Maarteners in the Netherlands.

After moving back to Sint Maarten, Gumbs co-founded the youth party Party for Progress (PFP) in 2019 and has been party leader ever since. In the 2020 elections, she received 559 votes, equivalent to 39.7% of all votes cast for PFP. On 10 February 2020, she took office as a member of parliament and group leader on behalf of the PFP.
