= Marlin-Romeo cabinet =

Marlin-Romeo cabinet may refer to:

- First Marlin-Romeo cabinet, the cabinet of Sint Maarten under Prime Minister Leona Marlin-Romeo, 2018
- Second Marlin-Romeo cabinet, the current Sint Maarten cabinet, since 25 June 2018
