= First Marlin cabinet =

Cabinet of Sint Maarten, 2015 to 2016

- 5th Cabinet of Sint Maarten

- Date formed: 19 November 2015
- Date dissolved: 20 December 2016

People and organisations
- Head of state: Willem-Alexander
- Head of government: William Marlin
- Member parties: National Alliance (NA); Democratic Party (DP); United St. Maarten Party (USP); Maurice Lake; Silvio Matser

History
- Predecessor: Gumbs
- Successor: Marlin II

The First Marlin cabinet was the fifth Cabinet of Sint Maarten installed following the achievement of constituent country status of Sint Maarten within the Kingdom of the Netherlands on 10 October 2010. The cabinet was a coalition between the National Alliance, Democratic Party, United St. Maarten Party and independent members of Parliament Maurice Lake and Silvio Matser.

== Composition ==
The cabinet is composed as follows:

Main office-holders
Office	Name	Party	Since
Prime Minister	William Marlin	NA	19 November 2015
Minister of Housing, Physical Planning, and Environment	William Marlin (interim)	NA	19 November 2015
Minister of Housing, Physical Planning, and Environment	Angel Meyers	^{[Note]}	27 November 2015
Minister of Finance	Richard Gibson	NA	19 November 2015
Minister of Justice	Richard Gibson (interim)	NA	19 November 2015
Minister of Justice	Edson Kirindongo	USP	26 January 2016
Minister of Tourism, Economic Affairs, Transport and Telecommunications	Irania Arrindell	^{[Note]}	19 November 2015
Minister of Healthcare, Social Development, and Labor	Emil Lee	DP	19 November 2015
Minister of Education, Culture, Youth, and Sports	Silveria Jacobs	NA	19 November 2015
Minister Plenipotentiary of Sint Maarten	Henrietta Doran-York	NA	19 November 2015

^{Note} Angel Meyers was put forward on Maurice Lake's recommendation, while Irania Arrindell was recommended by Silvio Matser.
