= 2020 Sint Maarten general election =

- 9 January 2020
- All 15 seats in Parliament; 8 seats needed for a majority
- Turnout: 59.56% (▼2.62pp)
Party	Leader	Vote %	Seats	+/–
NA	Silveria Jacobs	35.29	6	+1
UPP	Theodore Heyliger	24.18	4	+4
USP	Frans Richardson	13.19	2	0
PFP	Melissa Gumbs	10.53	2	New
UD	Sarah Wescot-Williams	8.69	1	−6
This lists parties that won seats. See the complete results below.
Prime Minister before	Prime Minister after
Silveria Jacobs; NA	Silveria Jacobs; NA

Snap general elections were held in Sint Maarten on 9 January 2020, two years earlier than scheduled, following the dissolution of the Second Marlin-Romeo cabinet in September 2019.

== Electoral system ==
The 15 seats in the Estates were elected by proportional representation. In order to participate in the election, new parties and parties without a seat in parliament were required to obtain at least 136 signatures; 1% of the valid votes of the 2018 general elections.

== Results ==
Party	Votes	%	Seats	+/–
National Alliance	4,715	35.29	6	+1
United People's Party	3,231	24.18	4	+4
United St. Maarten Party	1,762	13.19	2	0
Party for Progress	1,407	10.53	2	New
United Democrats	1,161	8.69	1	–6
St. Maarten Christian Party	759	5.68	0	–1
People's Progressive Alliance	326	2.44	0	0
Total	13,361	100.00	15	0
Valid votes	13,361	97.09		
Invalid votes	312	2.27		
Blank votes	89	0.65		
Total votes	13,762	100.00		
Registered voters/turnout	23,106	59.56		
Source: Government of Sint Maarten
