= Franklin Meyers =

Minister of Tourism, Economic Affairs, Transport and Telecommunications
- In office 10 October 2010 – 21 May 2012
- Prime Minister: Sarah Wescot-Williams
- Preceded by: Office created
- Succeeded by: Romeo Pantophlet

Member of the Parliament of Sint Maarten
- In office 2014–2019
- Incumbent
- Assumed office 2024

Member of the Sint Maarten Island Council
- In office 1999–2007

Personal details
- Born: 28 November 1967 (age 58) Sint Eustatius, Netherlands Antilles
- Party: Soualiga Action Movement (since 2024)
- Other political affiliations: United Democrats (2017–2019); United People's Party (2010–2017); Democratic Party (1995–2008); Partnership for Political Reform (1995)
- Spouse: Brenda Wathey
- Education: Miami Dade Community College

Franklin Antonio Meyers (born 28 November 1967) is a Sint Maarten businessman, undertaker, and politician who serves as a Member of Parliament since 2024. He previously served as an MP from 2014 to 2019 and was Minister of Tourism, Economic Affairs, Transport and Telecommunications in the First Wescot-Williams cabinet from 2010 to 2012.

== Early life ==
Franklin Meyers was born on 28 November 1967 on Sint Eustatius to Etienne H. Meyers and Eulalie Meyers (née Hazel). His maternal grandfather, Melford Hazel, was one of Sint Maarten's well-known politicians, who served as an Island Council member for many years. At the age of 4 he moved to Sint Maarten with his Family, where he attended the Oranje School and then the Old Pond Side School. In 1983 he attended Newtown High School in New York and obtained his high school diploma in 1987. Two years later after having several jobs on Sint Maarten Meyers traveled on to Miami Dade Community College and got a degree in Mortuary Science in 1991. Soon thereafter he returned to Sint Maarten and was hired at the newly established Emerald Funeral Home.

== Political career ==
In 1994 he postulated himself for the Netherlands Antilles parliamentary election on Joseph Richardson's Partnership for Political Reform Party but did not obtain enough votes to be elected. The following year, he joined the Democratic Party (DP) for the island council election but once again was unable to secure the sufficient votes needed to be elected. In the 1999 island council election Meyers received 534 votes and was elected. He resigned from his position at Emerald Funeral Home to serve in public office, he became a member of the Executive Council and the Island Council and served as a Commissioner for 2 consecutive terms from 1999 until 2007.

On 30 June 2008 Meyers resigned as a member from the Democratic Party citing the frequent controversies and statements made by then DP member Maria Buncamper-Molanus.

In 2010, Meyers along with Theodore Heyliger and a few others established the United People's Party (UP). While Meyers decided not to seek election for public office at that time, he stayed on as President of the party. After forming the very first government of country Sint Maarten, with the DP, the UP Party was sworn into office and Meyers took on the position of Minister of Tourism, Economic Affairs, Telecommunications, and Transportation. In April 2012, United People's parliamentary faction leader Romain Laville left his party and became an independent member of parliament causing the first Wescot-Williams government to fall. Meyers was succeeded by Romeo Pantophlet of the National Alliance (NA) on 21 May 2012.

== Personal life ==
In 2007, after deciding to retire from politics he started his own business; the Royal Funeral Home and Crematorium. During this time, Meyers successfully obtained his private pilot license. In 2013 Meyers married his long time partner businesswoman Brenda Wathey in Bali, Indonesia.
