= Anna Richardson (politician) =

Sint Maarten politician

Minister of Justice
- Incumbent
- Assumed office 28 March 2020
- Prime Minister: Silveria Jacobs

Anna Richardson is a Sint Maarten politician. As of 28 March 2020, she serves as Minister of Justice in the second cabinet of Prime Minister Silveria Jacobs.
