= Ardwell Irion =

Sint Maarten politician

Minister of Finance
- Incumbent
- Assumed office 19 November 2019
- Prime Minister: Silveria Jacobs

Ardwell Irion is a Sint Maarten politician. He served as Minister of Finance in the first cabinet of Prime Minister Silveria Jacobs and, as of 28 March 2020, he serves in this role in her second cabinet.
