= 2016 Sint Maarten general election =

- 26 September 2016
- All 15 seats in Parliament; 8 seats needed for a majority
- Turnout: 65.45% (▼3.71pp)
Party	Leader	Vote %	Seats	+/–
UPP	Theo Heyliger	29.06	5	−2
NA	William Marlin	26.59	5	+1
USP	Frans Richardson	19.59	3	+1
DP	Sarah Wescott-Williams	12.76	2	0
This lists parties that won seats. See the complete results below.
Prime Minister before	Prime Minister after
William Marlin; NA	William Marlin; NA

General elections were held in Sint Maarten on 26 September 2016.

== Electoral system ==
The 15 seats in the Estates were elected by proportional representation. In order to participate in the election, new parties and parties without a seat in parliament were required to obtain at least 146 signatures; 1% of the valid votes of the 2014 parliamentary elections.

== Results ==
Party	Votes	%	Seats	+/–
United People's Party	4,130	29.06	5	–2
National Alliance	3,778	26.59	5	+1
United St. Maarten Party	2,784	19.59	3	+1
Democratic Party Sint Maarten	1,813	12.76	2	0
St. Maarten Christian Party	848	5.97	0	New
St. Maarten Development Movement	346	2.43	0	New
People's Progressive Alliance	234	1.65	0	0
One St. Maarten People Party	203	1.43	0	0
Helping Our People Excel	75	0.53	0	New
Total	14,211	100.00	15	0
Valid votes	14,211	97.36		
Invalid/blank votes	385	2.64		
Total votes	14,596	100.00		
Registered voters/turnout	22,302	65.45		
Source: Government of Sint Maarten
