= Henrietta Doran-York =

Sint Maarten politician

Minister Plenipotentiary of Sint Maarten
- In office 19 November 2015 – 15 January 2018
- Prime Minister: William Marlin
- Preceded by: Josianne Fleming-Artsen
- Succeeded by: Hasani Ellis (as Deputy Minister Plenipotentiary)

Personal details
- Born: 30 August 1962 (age 63) Sint Maarten
- Party: National Alliance

Henrietta Doran-York (born 30 August 1962) is a politician from Sint Maarten. She was Minister Plenipotentiary of Sint Maarten from 19 November 2015 until 15 January 2018. She previously served as Deputy Minister Plenipotentiary. Doran-York is a member of the National Alliance party, and has run in several elections.

Doran-York had a career in the prison system of Sint Maarten, then under control of the Netherlands Antilles. She eventually became head supervisor. In the 2010 Netherlands Antilles general election, Doran-York obtained a seat. In 2011 she became a manager at the Sint Maarten Ministry of Justice. In May 2015 she became head of the Windward Islands Civil Servants Union/Private Sector Union.

Her son Egbert Jurendy Doran was elected to the Estates of Sint Maarten in the 2018 Sint Maarten general election.
