= Grisha Heyliger-Marten =

Politician from Sint Maarten (born 1976)

Grisha S. Heyliger-Marten (born 28 July 1976) is a politician from Sint Maarten. She was President of the Parliament of Sint Maarten from november 2021 to October 2022, as a member of the United People's Party. She is the wife of Theodore Heyliger, a criminal indicted for high corruption in government, such as sabotaging the harbour real-estate project in St. Maarten.

She was first elected to the Parliament of Sint Maarten in the 2020 general election.
