= National Progressive Party (Sint Maarten) =

The National Progressive Party (Dutch: Nationale Progressieve Partij) is a political party in Sint Maarten. At the last legislative elections in the Netherlands Antilles, 18 January 2002, the party joined the National Alliance that won 4.8% of the popular vote and 1 out of 22 seats.
