= Josianne Fleming-Artsen =

Minister Plenipotentiary of Sint Maarten
- In office 19 December 2014 – 19 November 2015
- Preceded by: Mathias Voges
- Succeeded by: Henrietta Doran-York

Personal details
- Born: 1949 (age 76–77)
- Party: United People's Party
- Children: 9

Josianne Fleming-Artsen (born 1949) is an educator and politician, who served as Minister Plenipotentiary of Sint Maarten from 2014 to 2015 and Deputy Minister Plenipotentiary of Sint Maarten from 2013 to 2014. She served as president of the University of St. Martin from 1999 to 2010.
