= Leona Marlin-Romeo =

Sint Maarten politician

Leona M. Romeo
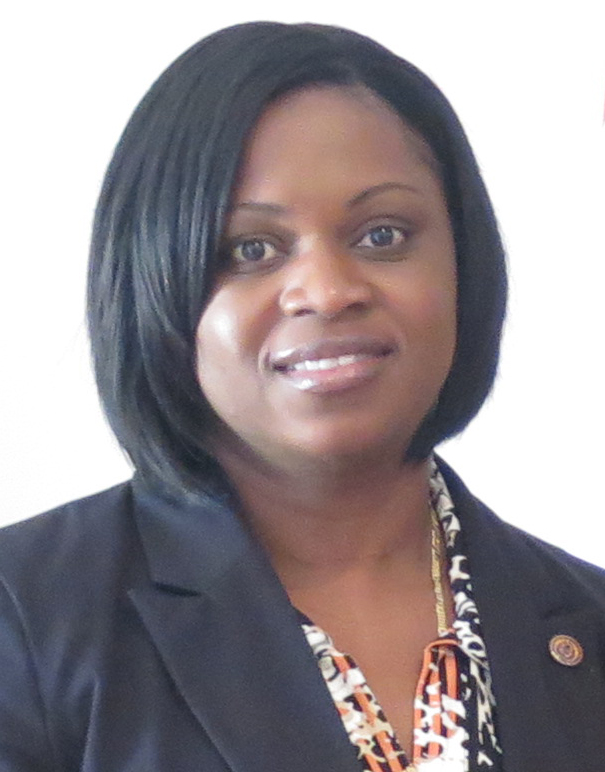

5th Prime Minister of Sint Maarten
- In office 15 January 2018 – 10 October 2019
- Monarch: Willem-Alexander
- Governor: Eugene Holiday
- Preceded by: Rafael Boasman
- Succeeded by: Wycliffe Smith

Personal details
- Born: 3 July 1973 (age 53) Sint Maarten, Netherlands Antilles
- Party: United Democrats (2018–present)
- Other political affiliations: United People's Party (2016–2017); Independent (2014-16); United St. Maarten Party (2014); National Alliance (until 2014)
- Spouse: Richard Marlin
- Children: 2
- Education: University of Amsterdam; Adelphi University

Leona M. Romeo (born 3 July 1973) is a Sint Maarten politician who served as Prime Minister of Sint Maarten from 2018 to 2019. After studying in the Netherlands Marlin-Romeo returned to Sint Maarten in 2005 to work in the civil registry. She served as a member of the Estates of Sint Maarten from 2014 to 2016. In January 2018 she was appointed prime minister following the collapse of the Rafael Boasman-led United St. Maarten government. Marlin-Romeo's United Democrats party won a plurality in the 2018 elections and secured a majority with the support of the St. Maarten Christian Party and an independent. The United Democrats suffered a number of defections in 2019 that lost Marlin-Romeo her majority and she resigned on 10 September.

== Early life ==
Leona Marlin-Romeo was born on 3 July 1973 on Sint Maarten to Marius Romeo and Marilyn Thomas. As a child, Marlin-Romeo attended the Methodist Agogic Center (MAC) in Sint Maarten. She briefly attended St. Maarten Academy before transferring to Oak Hill Academy in Virginia. She graduated from Adelphi University in 1995 with a bachelor's degree in political science and a minor in French. She continued her education at the University of Amsterdam where she graduated with a master's degree in International Relations. In 2005, Marlin-Romeo returned to Sint Maarten, and began working as the Head of the Civil Registry Department.

== Politics ==
Marlin-Romeo served as a member of Estates from 2014 to 2016. She was appointed prime minister on 15 January 2018 at the head of a United Democrats interim government. This succeeded the short-lived Rafael Boasman-led United St. Maarten government, which itself had come to power after the collapse of the William Marlin-led National Alliance government in November 2017. elections were held on 26 February and Marlin-Romeo's party won seven of the fifteen seats. Marlin-Romeo remained prime minister with a majority secured by the support of an independent member of the Estates who defected from the National Alliance party. Her government also received the support of the member from the St. Maarten Christian Party.

Defections from the United Democrats meant that Marlin-Romeo lost her majority on 9 September 2019. She resigned the following day and was succeeded by Wycliffe Smith of the Christian Party.

== See also ==
- List of Sint Maarten leaders of government
