= One St. Maarten People Party =

- Leader: Lenny Priest
- President: Lloyd Beaton
- Founded: 1 August 2013; 12 years ago
- Colours: Purple
- Parliament of Sint Maarten: 0 / 15

The One St. Maarten People Party (OSPP) is a political party in Sint Maarten founded in 2013 by former Sint Maarten Patriotic Alliance finance commissioner Lenny Priest. At the 2014 general elections on 29 August, the party obtained 1.16% of the votes and failed to obtain a seat in parliament.
