= 2010 Sint Maarten general election =

- 17 September 2010
- All 15 seats in Parliament; 8 seats needed for a majority
- Turnout: 71.47%
Party	Leader	Vote %	Seats	+/–
NA	William Marlin	45.87	7	+2
UPP	Theo Heyliger	36.09	6	New
DP	Sarah Wescott-Williams	17.11	2	−4
This lists parties that won seats. See the complete results below.
Prime Minister before	Prime Minister after
Office established	Sarah Wescott-Williams; DP

Early general elections were held in Sint Maarten on 17 September 2010 to elect the 15 members of the Island Council. The National Alliance led by William Marlin emerged as the largest party, winning 7 of the 15 seats. However, a coalition government was formed by the Democratic Party and the United People's Party. Despite only having won two seats, the Democratic Party's Sarah Wescot-Williams became Prime Minister.

== Background ==
Early elections were needed because the Island Council was enlarged from 11 to 15 seats.

== Results ==
Party	Votes	%	Seats	+/–
National Alliance	6,273	45.87	7	+2
United People's Party	4,936	36.09	6	New
Democratic Party	2,340	17.11	2	–4
Concordia Political Alliance	127	0.93	0	New
Total	13,676	100.00	15	+4
Valid votes	13,676	97.62		
Invalid/blank votes	333	2.38		
Total votes	14,009	100.00		
Registered voters/turnout	19,601	71.47		
Source: Election Passport

== Aftermath ==
The Island Council was converted into the Estates of Sint Maarten after Sint Maarten received country status within the Kingdom of the Netherlands on 10 October 2010.
