= Marcel Gumbs =

2nd Prime Minister of Sint Maarten

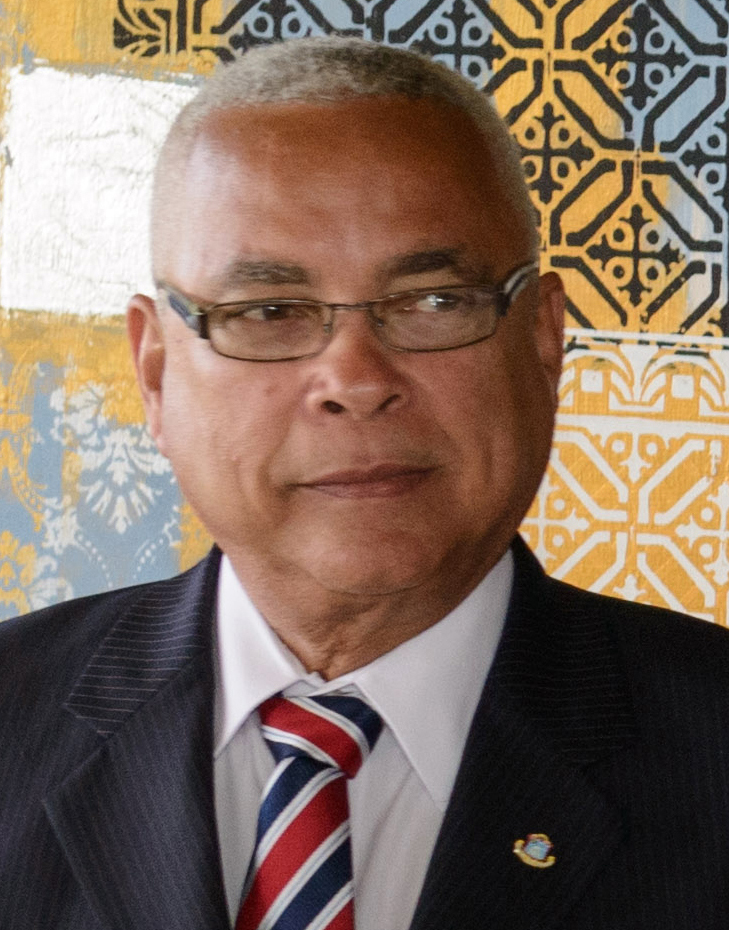

2nd Prime Minister of Sint Maarten
- In office 19 December 2014 – 19 November 2015
- Monarch: Willem-Alexander
- Governor: Eugene Holiday
- Preceded by: Sarah Wescot-Williams
- Succeeded by: William Marlin

Personal details
- Born: 26 February 1953 (age 73) Curacao
- Party: United People's Party
- Website: Government website

Marcel Faustiano Augustin Gumbs (born 26 February 1953) is a Sint Maarten politician who served as the 2nd Prime Minister of Sint Maarten from 2014 to 2015. He was selected as prime minister in the coalition agreement between the United People's Party and the independent members of Parliament Cornelius de Weever and Leona Marlin-Romeo. Prior to becoming prime minister, he served as a member on the Sint Maarten Council of Advice.

== Early life ==
Marcel Gumbs was born on 26 February 1953 on Curaçao. As a child, Gumbs attended the St. Joseph School in Sint Maarten.

== Political career ==
He began his career in 1983, as an observer in the Parliament of the Netherlands Antilles for the Democratic Party (DP). In that same year, he postulated himself for the Island Council election but did not obtain enough votes to be elected. In the 1985 parliamentary election, Gumbs received 218 votes and was elected to parliament for his first term. In 1990, when DP leader Claude Wathey refused to accept his parliamentary seat, Gumbs having received the next highest votes, 419 was sworn into his second parliamentary term. For the 1994 parliamentary election, Gumbs led the DP and was elected to a third term with a career high 919 votes. After receiving 416 votes in the 1998 parliamentary election, Gumbs became a junior minister in the cabinet of Prime Minister Susanne Camelia-Römer.

== See also ==
- List of Sint Maarten leaders of government
