= Constitution of Sint Maarten =

The Constitution of Sint Maarten (Dutch: Staatsregeling van Sint Maarten) was unanimously adopted by the island council of Sint Maarten on 21 July 2010.

The constitution entered into force on 10 October 2010, on the date of the dissolution of the Netherlands Antilles.
