= St. Maarten Christian Party =

The Sint Maarten Christian Party (SMCP) is a political party on Sint Maarten with a Christian democratic orientation.

== History ==
The party was founded by Wycliffe Smith and J. Edwin Arrindell on 4 November 2015. They published a draft manifesto on 22 March 2016. The party was created during a meeting of church leaders held on November 4, 2014, which led to the idea of the party being born. The SMCP participated for the first time in the 2016 state elections but failed to win any seats within these elections. In the subsequent elections of 2018, the SCMP managed to win a single seat in the state elections, gaining representation in the Sint Marteen Parliament. Following the 2018 Elections, the SMCP formed a coalition government with the United Democrats, named the Second Marlin-Romeo Cabinet. The Party leader at the time became the Coalition's appointed cabinet Minister of Education, Culture, Youth and Sports. After the resignation of Prime Minister Leona Marlin-Romeo, Party Founder and Leader of the SMCP, Wycliffe Smith became Prime Minister of Sint Maarten. On behalf of the party, Claude Peterson served in the States of Sint Marteen from 2018 to 2020. During the 2020 state elections, the SMCP did not win a seat.

== Party beliefs ==
The SMCP is guided by Christian norms and values in determining its positions. The SMCP is in favor of reducing the salaries of members of the States by 15 percent. It also wants members of the States to take their task more seriously, meet more often in committees and hold the prime minister more accountable for policy. In addition, the party made many proposals to combat poverty in Sint Maarten. It is an advocate of the separation of church and state. The party is in favor of changing the current abortion legislation, so that there is no longer a total ban. Furthermore, the party believes that Sint Maarten should seek more connection with the other territories inside of the Kingdom of the Netherlands.

== Electoral results ==
Election	Votes	%	Seats	+/–
2016 general election	848	5.97	0	New
2018 general election	1,181	8.71	1	+1
2020 general election	759	5.68	0	–1
