= Gracita Arrindell =

First President of the Parliament of Sint Maarten

President of Parliament
- In office 10 October 2010 – 14 July 2012
- Monarch: Willem-Alexander
- Governor: Eugene Holiday
- Preceded by: Office created
- Succeeded by: Rodolphe E. Samuel
- In office 24 June 2013 – 9 October 2014
- Preceded by: Rodolphe E. Samuel
- Succeeded by: Lloyd J. Richardson

Personal details
- Born: 4 March 1956 (age 70) Curaçao
- Party: Unified Resilient St. Maarten Movement

Gracita Arrindell (born 4 March 1956) is a politician of Sint Maarten, writer and women's rights activist, who was the first President of the Parliament of Sint Maarten, a role she held for two non-consecutive terms.

In 2025 she is Minister Plenipotentiary.

== Biography ==
Born in Curaçao, she was awarded an MA degree in political science from the Catholic University, Nijmegen. In 1988, she became deputy secretary of the Island Council. In 1994 she was the chair of the Constitutional Referendum Committee. In 1999 she was a candidate in the Island Council (IC) elections, representing the Democratic Party. However she later joined the People's Progressive Alliance (PPA), who won their first seat in 2003.

In Looking Back to Move Forward (2006), Arrindell edited a collection of speeches by former Prime Ministers of the Netherlands Antilles.

Arrindell was the first person to be elected President of the Parliament of Sint Maarten. She held the role of President for two terms: the first from 10 October 2010 to 14 July 2012; the second from 24 June 2013 to 9 October 2014. During her tenure she was also the leader of the PPA. She has spoken out against the nepotism that has been common in political appointments on the island.

In 2022, she was chair of the supervisory board of Directors of the Princess Juliana International Airport.

In 2024, she was president of the Peridot Foundation, an organisation she founded to combat domestic violence in Saba, Sint Eustasius and Sint Maarten.

In 2024, she was Deputy Minister Plenipotentiary. In the same year she published From Slavery to Freedom.

== Awards ==
In 2009 she was recognised with an Emerald Award from the Women of Great Esteem (WGE) Organization.
