= University of St. Martin =

Coordinates: 18.026699°N 63.043890°W

Seal of the university

The University of St. Martin (USM) is a university in Philipsburg, Sint Maarten, founded in 1989. The USM has about 350 part and full-time students, and more than 800 alumni. Its president is currently Dr. Antonio Carmona Baez.

USM was established in 1989 by Dr. Albert Claudius Wathey and Ambassador Dr. Hushang Ansary as an annex of Johnson & Wales University, and with the intention of improving the performance of employees at the Mullet Bay Resort. Its facilities were destroyed by Hurricane Lenny in 1999, but the university was rebuilt.

By forging a symbiotic relationship with the University of the Virgin Islands (UVI), USM planned to build additional classrooms and dormitories. The agreement, popularly referred to as UVI@USM, made it possible for students on the island to obtain North American accredited BA and MA degrees. The USM also had articulation agreements with Florida A&M University (FAMU), l’Université de Paris XII: Val-de-Marne, Florida Metropolitan University, Florida State University (FSU), University of South Florida, University of Tampa, Johnson & Wales University (JWU), Berkeley College, Pace University, Monroe College, and Mount Saint Vincent University (MSVU) in Halifax, Canada.

== Degree programs ==
USM offered the following degree programs:

- Associate of Arts in Business with specializations in: Accounting
- Associate of Arts in Business with specializations in: Management
- Associate of Arts in General Liberal Arts (Humanities and Social Sciences)
- Associate of Arts in General Liberal Arts (Concentration Math & Science)
- Associate of Applied Arts in Hospitality & Tourism Management
- Bachelor of Arts in Education (with UVI)
- Bachelor of Arts in Social Work (with UVI)

USM also offered a Secondary Teaching Certificate program, English as a Second Language (ESL) program, General Equivalency Diploma (GED) Tutorial Program, and the pre-USM Program (College Preparatory Program, which included the GED). Besides these courses through the UVI@USM students also were eligible to enroll in degree programs offered by the University of the Virgin Islands.
