= People's Progressive Alliance (Sint Maarten) =

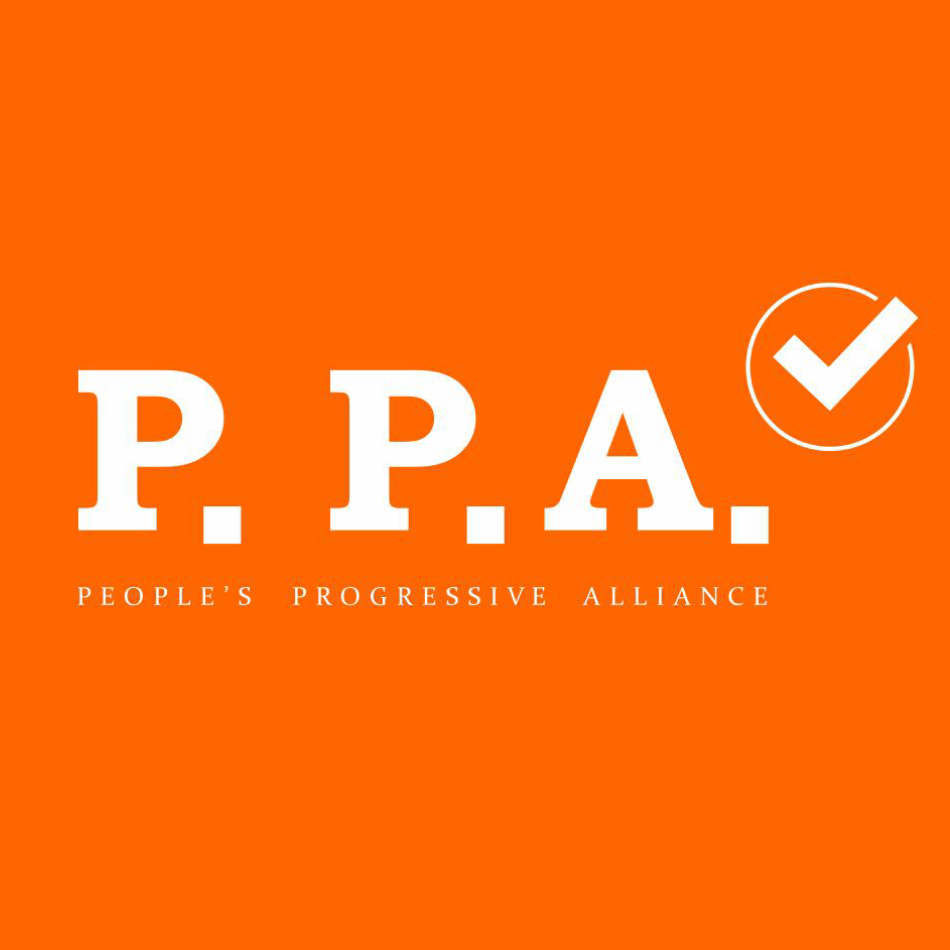
- Leader: Gracita Arrindell
- President: Don Hughes
- Founder: Gracita R. Arrindell
- Founded: 20 January 2003
- Merged into: United People's Party
- Colours: Orange

The People's Progressive Alliance (PPA) is a political party in Sint Maarten. At the legislative elections of the Netherlands Antilles on 22 January 2010, the party won no seats.

The party was thought to have been dissolved in 2010, however, from 2016 onwards it was once again contesting elections in Sint Maarten.

In 2019, they neglected the Dutch Quarter, as stated in a town hall meeting.
