= Wycliffe Smith =

Dutch politician, pastor and poet (born 1948)

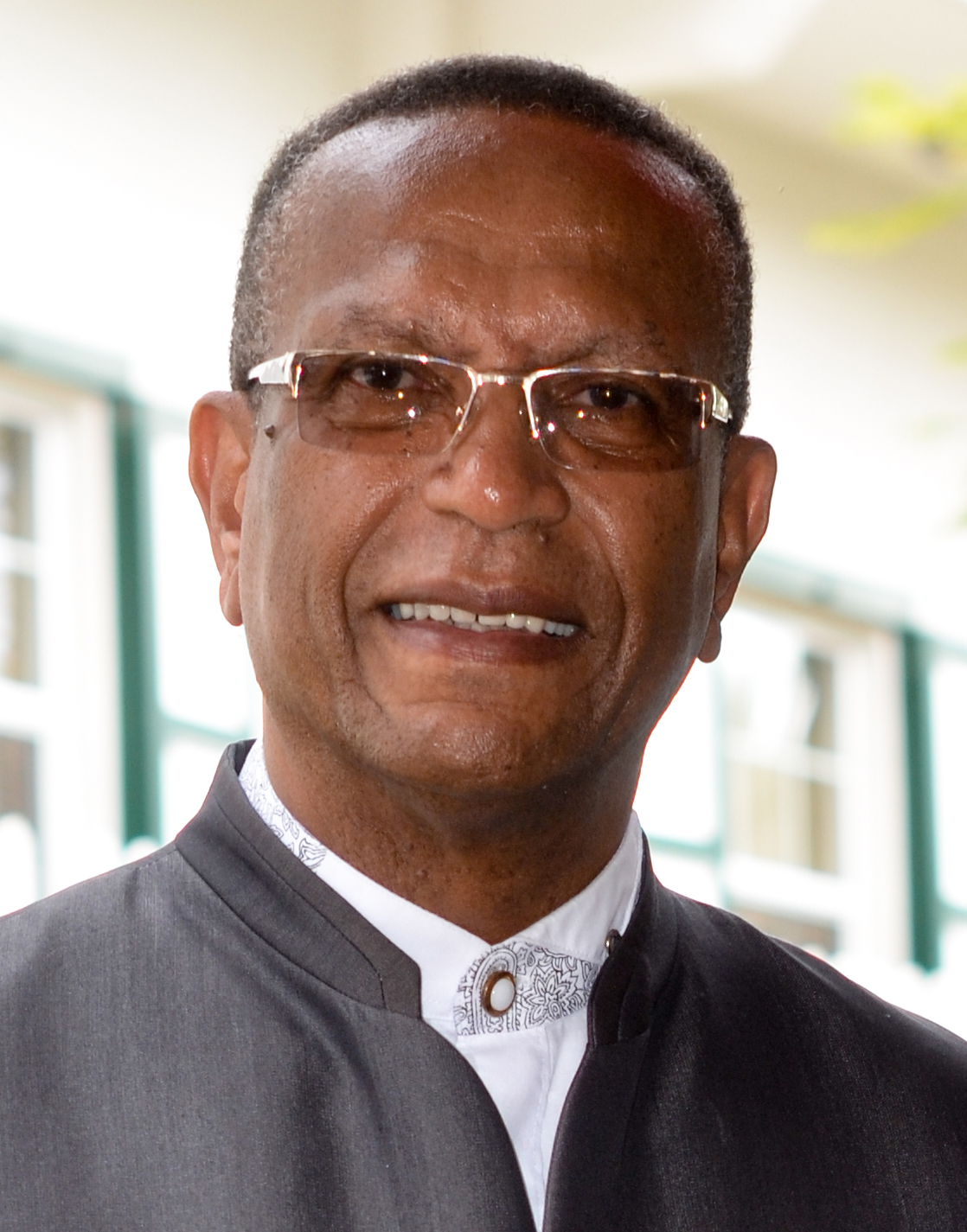
- Smith in 2015

6th Prime Minister of Sint Maarten
- In office 10 October 2019 – 19 November 2019
- Monarch: Willem-Alexander
- Governor: Eugene Holiday
- Preceded by: Leona Marlin-Romeo
- Succeeded by: Silveria Jacobs

Lieutenant Governor of Saba
- In office 1 November 1983 – 1989
- Monarch: Beatrix
- Preceded by: Raphael Sorton (acting)
- Succeeded by: Sydney Sorton

Personal details
- Born: 18 December 1948 (age 77) Saba
- Party: Sint Maarten Christian Party
- Education: Columbia University

Wycliffe Sylvester Smith (born 18 December 1948) is a Sint Maarten politician, former pastor and poet. Born on the island of Saba, he was educated in Sint Maarten, the Netherlands and the U.S. before becoming a teacher. He worked many years as a pastor in Sint Maarten and has published several works of poetry, being considered an expert on literature in the Windward Islands. Smith served as lieutenant governor of Saba from 1983 to 1989 and later became the president of the University of St. Martin. In 2015, he established the Sint Maarten Christian Party and later was appointed the Minister of Education, Culture, Youth and Sport. He then briefly served as prime minister of Sint Maarten in 2019.

== Biography ==
Smith was born on 18 December 1948 on the island of Saba. He was educated on the island of Sint Maarten, where he received a MULO diploma. Afterwards, he studied in the Netherlands and graduated as a fully qualified teacher in 1971. Smith later studied in the U.S. at Columbia University in New York, receiving two master's degrees from Columbia's Teachers College.

Smith has worked as a teacher, poet, pastor, musician, and is considered an expert on literature in the Windward Islands. He once toured Europe as a singer in a band. Active in church, he started by working as a cleaner and eventually rose to become head pastor of the New Testament Baptist Church at Philipsburg, Sint Maarten, where he served many years. Smith retired as a pastor in 2014. He has written several poetry books, beginning in 1976 with the publication of A Voice from Windward. Considered a pioneer of literary criticism in the Windward Islands, Smith later authored the book Windward Island Verse in 1981 and in 1982 edited Winds Above the Hills, the first anthology of poetry from the islands. He also wrote A Broken Dream with Carmen Simmons in 1979, Nature, I Love You in 1980 along with Enrique Muller and others, Mind Adrift: The Development of Poetry in the Dutch Windward Islands in 1983, and The Story Boat: Stories from Island Travels Over the Water. Now They Are Taking a Boat to You with James Franklin Wilson and others in 2002.

Smith served as an inspector for the Department of Education on Sint Maarten and had become the department's head in 1983 before becoming lieutenant governor of Saba on 1 November 1983, succeeding the retired Raphael Sorton. He served as lieutenant governor of Saba until 1989. Afterwards, he served as the president of the University of St. Martin in the 1990s, later remaining on the university's board after his retirement from the position of president.

Following his retirement as a pastor, Smith returned to politics in 2015 and established the Sint Maarten Christian Party. He served as the leader of his party and by 2019 became the Minister of Education, Culture, Youth and Sport. After the resignation of Leona Romeo-Marlin, Smith was appointed the prime minister of Sint Maarten on 10 October 2019. He was succeeded by Silveria Jacobs in this position on 19 November and returned to being a member of the Parliament of Sint Maarten.

== Bibliography ==
- 1976 – A Voice from Windward (poems)
- 1979 – A Broken Dream
- 1980 – Nature, I Love You
- 1981 – Windward Island Verse: a survey of poetry in the Dutch Windward Islands
- 1982 – Winds Above the Hills: a collection of poems from St. Maarten, Netherlands Antilles (poems)
- 1983 – Mind Adrift: The Development of Poetry in the Dutch Windward Islands
- 2002 – The Story Boat: Stories from Island Travels Over the Water. Now They Are Taking a Boat to You
