= Rafael Boasman =

Prime Minister of Sint Maarten

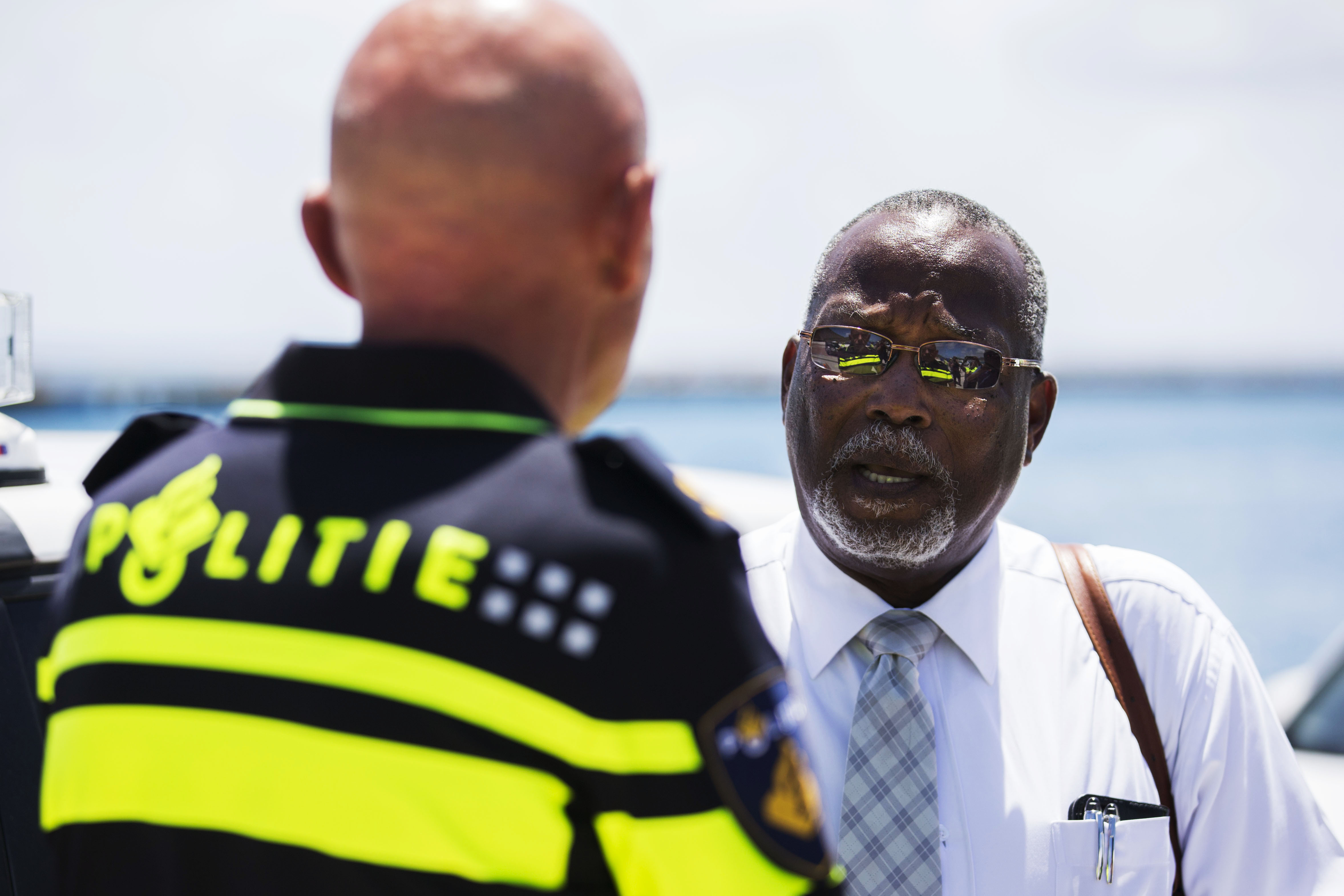
- Rafael Boasman 2017

4th Prime Minister of Sint Maarten
- In office 24 November 2017 – 15 January 2018
- Monarch: Willem-Alexander
- Governor: Eugene Holiday
- Preceded by: William Marlin
- Succeeded by: Leona Marlin-Romeo

Personal details
- Born: 5 June 1953 (age 72) Aruba
- Party: United St. Maarten Party

Rafael A. Boasman (Aruba, born 5 June 1953) was Prime Minister of Sint Maarten from 24 November 2017 to 15 January 2018. From 20 December 2016 to 15 January 2018, Boasman was also the Minister of Justice. He was also Minister of Healthcare, Social Development, and Labor from 7 September 2015 to 19 November 2015 and Minister of Tourism, Economic Affairs, Transport and Telecommunications from 20 December 2016 to 4 April 2017.

Boasman became Prime Minister after two motions of no confidence and an instruction by the Dutch Kingdom Council of Ministers to Governor Eugene Holiday to dismiss William Marlin with immediate effect on 24 November 2017.

== See also ==
- List of Sint Maarten leaders of government
