= Silveria Jacobs =

Sint Maarten politician

Her Excellency Silveria Jacobs
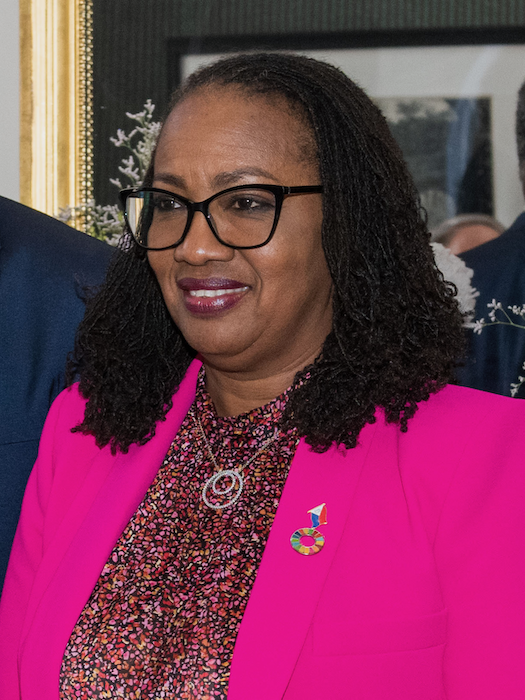
- Jacobs in 2023

7th Prime Minister of Sint Maarten
- In office 19 November 2019 – 3 May 2024
- Monarch: Willem-Alexander
- Governor: Eugene Holiday; Ajamu Baly
- Preceded by: Wycliffe Smith
- Succeeded by: Luc Mercelina

Personal details
- Born: 31 July 1968 (age 58) Aruba, Netherlands Antilles
- Party: National Alliance
- Children: 2
- Education: University of the Virgin Islands

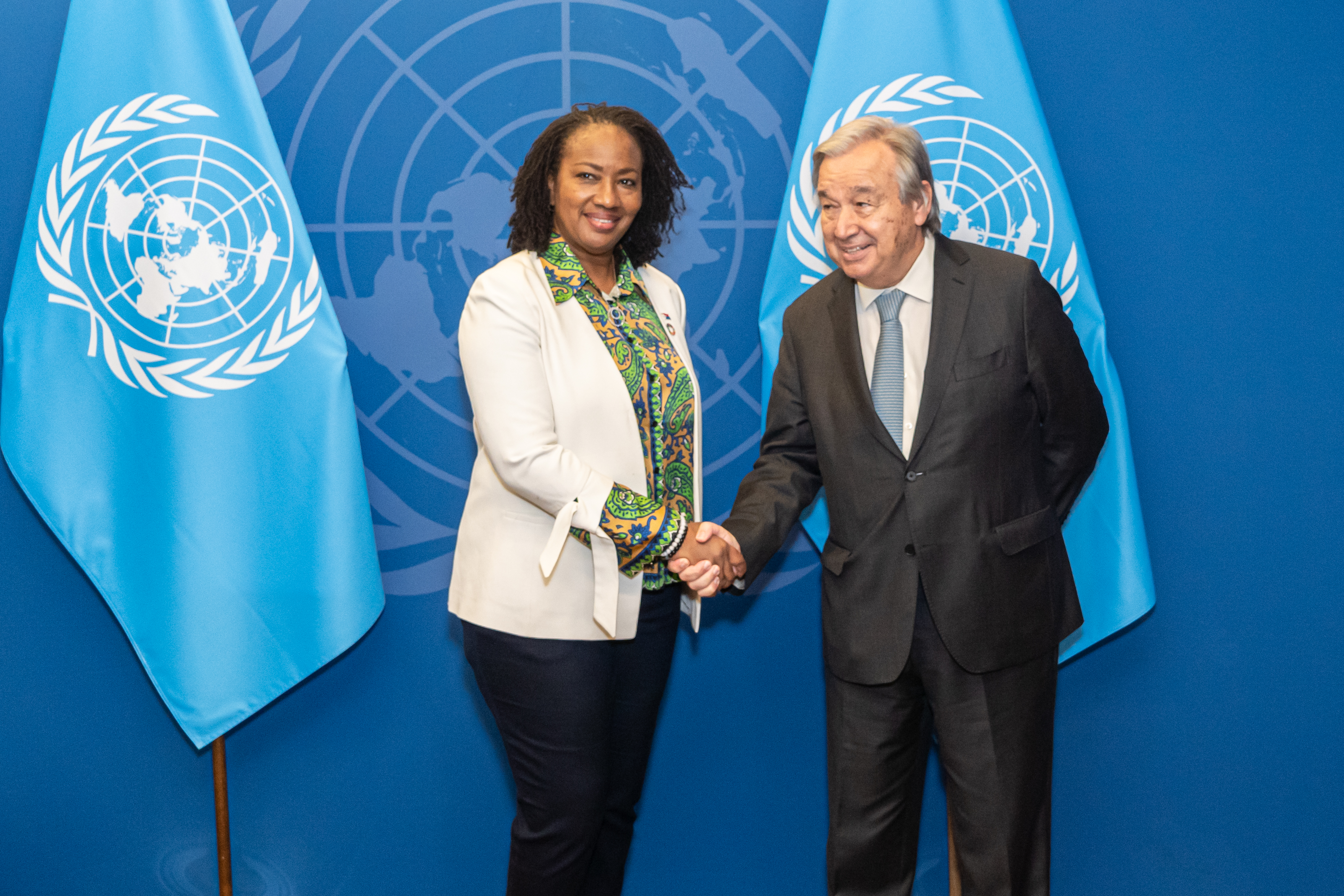
Jacobs meeting with UN Secretary-General António Guterres in 2022

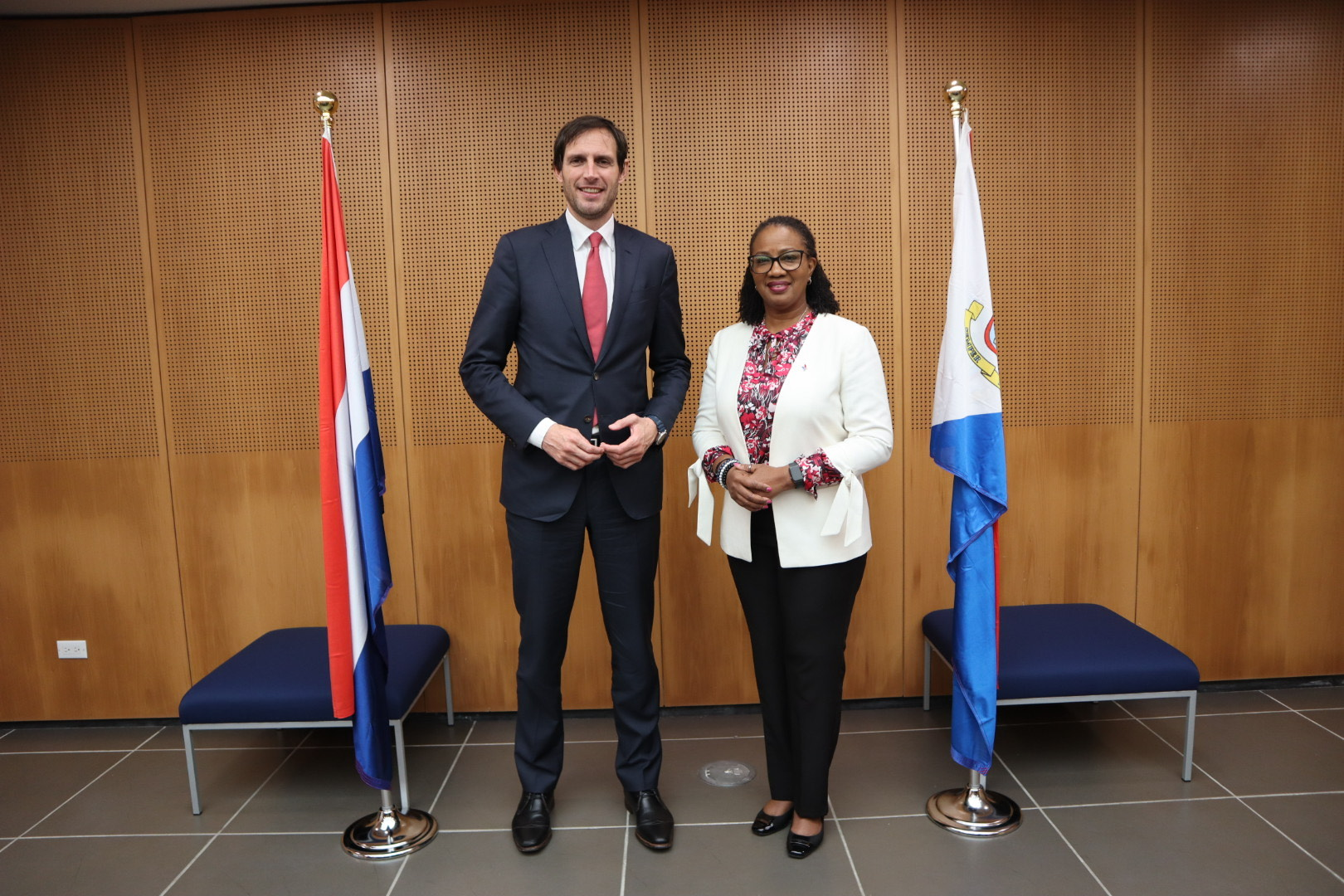
Jacobs meeting with Dutch Foreign Minister Wopke Hoekstra in 2022

Silveria Elfrieda Jacobs (born 31 July 1968) is a Sint Maarten politician and the former Prime Minister of Sint Maarten from 2019 to 2024.

== Early life and education ==
Silveria Elfrieda Jacobs was born on 31 July 1968 on Aruba to Nadia Willemsberg. As a child, Jacobs attended the Leonald Conner School and Milton Peters College on Sint Maarten. After receiving her HAVO diploma in 1986, Jacobs enrolled at the University of the Virgin Islands where she obtained a bachelor's degree in Education. Between 1992 and 2011, Jacobs worked at the Leonard Conner primary school in Philipsburg, first as a teacher and later as a student coordinator.

== Career ==
In 2010, Jacobs joined the National Alliance (NA). Between 2012 and 2013, she served as Minister of Education, Youth, Sport and Culture in the second Wescot-Williams cabinet. She also held this office from 2015 to 2018 in the first and second Marlin cabinets.

In 2014, she was elected a member of parliament. On 3 January 2018, she succeeded William Marlin as the NA party leader, the first woman in this position. In the previous three elections Jacobs, finished overall as the second largest vote getter behind Theodore Heyliger.

After the fall of the second Marlin-Romeo cabinet, a coalition agreement was reached between the National Alliance, the United St. Maarten Party and independent MPs Luc Mercelina and Chanel Brownbill. Jacobs was appointed by Governor Eugene Holiday on 30 September 2019 to form an interim cabinet that should, among other things, give priority to the completion of anti-money laundering legislation and the preparation of state elections and electoral reforms. The first Jacobs cabinet was sworn in on 19 November 2019.

Jacobs addressed the 2020 coronavirus pandemic in Sint Maarten. She ordered an extension to travel restrictions on 11 March 2020. The second Jacobs cabinet was sworn in on 28 March 2020. The second Jacobs cabinet consisted of Minister of Housing, Spatial Planning and Development (VROMI) Egbert Jurendy Doran; Minister of Education, Culture, Youth and Sport Rodolphe Samuel; Minister of Finance Ardwell Irion; Minister of Justice Anna Richardson; Minister of Labor and Health (VSA) Omar Ottley, Minister of Plenipotentiary Renee Violenus; Minister Tourism, Economic Affairs, Traffic, and Telecommunications (TEATT) Arthur Leo Lambriex. The position of Minister of TEATT was held by Richard Pannefleck, who was succeeded by Member of Parliament Ludmila de Weever. Upon MP de Weever's return to Parliament, Roger Lawrence was appointed Minister of TEATT. Subsequent to Mr. Lawrence's resignation, Arthur Leo Lambriex took on and remained in the Ministerial position for the remainder of the Jacobs II Cabinet tenure.

== See also ==
- List of Sint Maarten leaders of government
