= Ajamu Baly =

2nd Governor of Sint Maarten

His Excellency Ajamu Baly

2nd Governor of Sint Maarten
- Incumbent
- Assumed office 10 October 2022
- Monarch: Willem-Alexander
- Prime Minister: Silveria Jacobs; Luc Mercelina
- Preceded by: Eugene Holiday

Personal details
- Born: Ajamu G. Baly; 1977 Sint Maarten
- Education: University of Amsterdam

Ajamu Baly (born 1977) is a Sint Maarten politician currently serving as the second governor of Sint Maarten since 10 October 2022.

== Early life and career ==
Ajamu Baly was born in St. Maarten, he attended Sister Borgia Elementary School in Philipsburg and subsequently the Milton Peters College. He later moved to the Netherlands to study law at the University of Amsterdam.

After graduating with a law degree, Baly returned to Sint Maarten and started working at the Ministry of Justice and Security in the Judicial Affairs department.

In February 2022, he was appointed as a Deputy Judge of Instruction at the Joint Court of Justice. He also currently serves on several boards and committees including the Supervisory Board of the Central Bank of Curaçao and Sint Maarten.

== Governor of Sint Maarten ==
In October 2022, he was installed by the Council of Ministers of the Kingdom of the Netherlands as Governor of Sint Maarten, succeeding Eugene Holiday. As of October 2023. Emiko Bird-Lake's nomination has been approved by The Kingdom Council of Ministers as acting Governor of St. Maarten.
