= Unified Resilient St. Maarten Movement =

- Abbreviation: URSM
- Leader: Luc Mercelina
- Founder: Luc Mercelina
- Founded: 10 October 2021; 4 years ago
- Split from: UP Party
- Ideology: Autonomism
- Colours: Teal
- Parliament of Sint Maarten: 3 / 15

Website
- ursm.sx

The Unified Resilient St. Maarten Movement (URSM) is a political party in Sint Maarten. It was founded in October 2021 by Luc Mercelina, who was at the time a member of Parliament for the United People's Party. The party contested the January 2024 general election winning two seats, and later entered a coalition agreement with the Democratic Party, Party for Progress and Nation Opportunity Wealth that designated URSM party leader Luc Mercelina as new Prime Minister.

== Election results ==
=== General elections ===
Election	Leader	Votes	%	Seats	+/–	Government
Jan 2024	Luc Mercelina	2,028	14.04%	2 / 15	New	Coalition
Aug 2024	Luc Mercelina	2,224	16.24%	3 / 15	▲1	TBA
