= Minister Plenipotentiary of Sint Maarten =

Representative of Sint Maarten in the Council of Ministers

The Minister Plenipotentiary of Sint Maarten (Dutch: Gevolmachtigd Minister van Sint Maarten) represents the constituent country of Sint Maarten in the Council of Ministers of the Kingdom of the Netherlands. The current Minister Plenipotentiary is Patrice Gumbs with Gracita Arrindell as the acting deputy.

A significant difference between the Netherlands Ministers and the Ministers Plenipotentiary is that the former Ministers are accountable for their politics and policies to the Dutch parliament. The Ministers Plenipotentiary, however, are accountable to their national governments. Therefore, the Ministers Plenipotentiary usually do not resign in the event of a Dutch cabinet crisis.

== List of ministers plenipotentiary of Sint Maarten ==
The following table lists the ministers plenipotentiary of Sint Maarten that have been in office since Sint Maarten became a country in the Kingdom of the Netherlands in 2010:

#	Name	Took office	Left office	Party
1	Mathias Voges	10 October 2010	19 December 2014	DP
2	Josianne Fleming-Artsen	19 December 2014	19 November 2015	UP
3	Henrietta Doran-York	19 November 2015	15 January 2018	NA
	Vacant	15 January 2018	25 June 2018	
4	Jorien Wuite	25 June 2018	19 November 2019	UD
5	Rene Violenus	28 November 2019	3 May 2024	NA
6	Patrice Gumbs	3 May 2024	Incumbent	PFP
6	Gracita Arrindell (acting)	3 May 2024	Incumbent	URSM
