= Sarah Wescot-Williams =

First Prime Minister of Sint Maarten

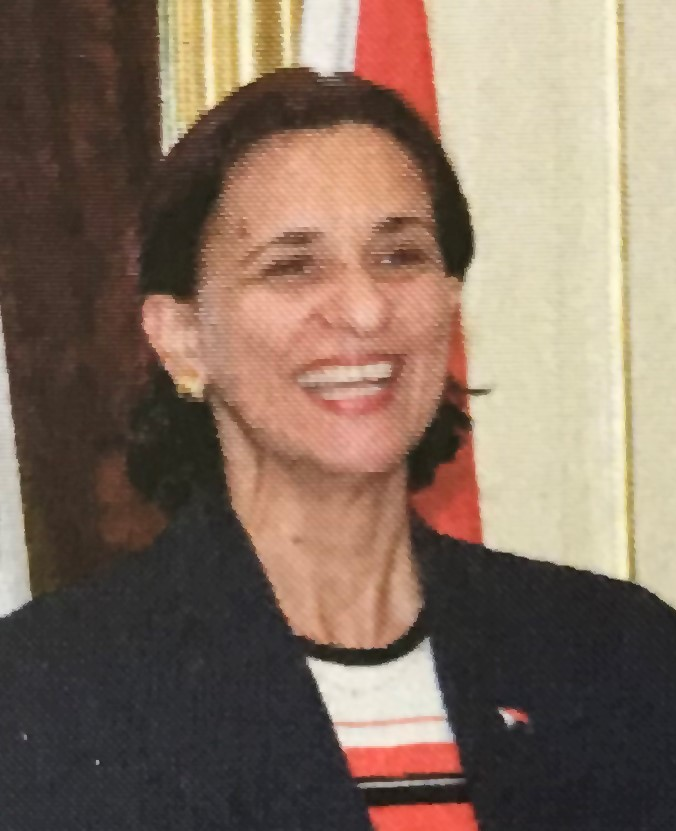

1st Prime Minister of Sint Maarten
- In office 10 October 2010 – 19 December 2014
- Monarchs: Beatrix; Willem-Alexander
- Governor: Eugene Holiday
- Deputy: Theodore Heyliger; William Marlin
- Preceded by: Office created
- Succeeded by: Marcel Gumbs

President of Parliament
- In office 10 October 2014 – 13 November 2014
- Preceded by: Gracita Arrindell
- Succeeded by: Lloyd J. Richardson
- In office 13 October 2015 – 31 October 2016
- Preceded by: Lloyd J. Richardson
- Succeeded by: Claret M.M. Connor
- In office 24 November 2016 – 2 April 2018
- Preceded by: Claret M.M. Connor
- In office 7 May 2018 – 22 September 2019
- Succeeded by: William V. Marlin
- Incumbent
- Assumed office 2024
- Preceded by: Sidharth M. Bijlani

Leader of the Democratic Party Sint Maarten
- Incumbent
- Assumed office 1994
- Preceded by: Claude Wathey

Personal details
- Born: 8 April 1956 (age 70) Saint Martin (France)
- Party: Democratic Party Sint Maarten
- Education: La Salle University
- Website: Government website

Sarah A. Wescot-Williams (born 8 April 1956) is the leader of the Democratic Party of Sint Maarten and was the first Prime Minister of Sint Maarten. Wescot-Williams is the current President of Parliament, the parliament's presiding officer, a role she has occupied on five occasions.

Following the 2010 establishment of Sint Maarten as an independent country and the holding of general elections, Wescot-Williams was selected as prime minister as part of a coalition agreement between the Democratic Party and the United People's Party.

After the collapse of the first Wescot-Williams cabinet in April 2012, she was again designated Prime Minister in the second Wescot-Williams cabinet installed on 21 May 2012. On 19 December 2014, Wescot-Williams was succeeded as prime minister by Marcel Gumbs.
