= Parliament of Sint Maarten =

Legislative body of Sint Maarten

Parliament of Sint Maarten Staten van Sint Maarten
- 7th Parliament of Sint Maarten

Type
- Type: Unicameral

History
- Founded: 10 October 2010

Leadership
- Monarch: King Willem-Alexander
- Governor: Ajamu Baly
- Prime Minister: Luc Mercelina, URSM since 3 May 2024
- President of Parliament: Sarah A. Wescot-Williams, DP since 10 February 2024

Structure
- Seats: 15
- Parliament political groups: Government (9): URSM (3); DP (3); PFP (2); SAM (1); Opposition (6): NA (3); UPP (2); N.O.W. (1)

Elections
- Parliament voting system: Proportional representation
- Last Parliament election: 19 August 2024

Motto
- Latin: coram populo

Website
- www.sxmparliament.org

The Parliament of Sint Maarten (Dutch: Staten van Sint Maarten) is a unicameral legislature that consists of 15 members, each elected for a four-year term in a general election. The first parliament was installed on 10 October 2010, the date of the dissolution of the Netherlands Antilles, and consisted of the members of the predecessor island council elected on 17 September 2010. The current President of Parliament is Sarah A. Wescot-Williams.

== Role and function ==
The parliament is the highest legislative body of the country and represents the entire population of the Dutch side of the island. The parliament consists of 15 members who are elected for a four-year period. The session year of parliament commences on the second Tuesday of September. During this session, the Governor provides an explanation of the policy to be pursued by the government. The parliament elects a President and Deputy President from its own numbers. The President of Parliament opens and closes the session year of the Parliament. Parliament is sometimes called a "co-legislator" with the Government, because both have control over policy.

Parliament's powers include:

- The right to approve and amend the budget
- The right of interpellation where each Member of Parliament (MP) has the right to question ministers of government in the General Assembly of Parliament
- The right of initiative allows MPs to submit draft laws on their own initiative
- The right to amendment, allows MPs to amend legislation that has been submitted to Parliament
- The right to ask questions, every MP can question a Minister orally or in writing
- The right to instigate inquiries allows parliament to institute an inquiry into the state of affairs in an event in which Government is involved

== Current parliament ==
The Government of Sint Maarten is based on a political party having a majority of the 15 seats in parliament. A political party would need to have eight seats in order to govern outright. However, more than one party can form a Government if parties can reach an agreement to do so. An independent member of parliament can also be part of the ranks of the opposition or be part of the governing party or coalition.

Current members of parliament were seated on February 9, 2024, following the January 2024 Sint Maarten general election.

=== Most recent election results ===
| Party | Votes | % | Seats | +/– |
|---|---|---|---|---|
| National Alliance | 3,455 | 23.92 | 4 | –2 |
| United People's Party | 2,814 | 19.48 | 3 | –1 |
| Unified Resilient St. Maarten Movement | 2,028 | 14.04 | 2 | New |
| Democratic Party | 1,970 | 13.64 | 2 | +1 (Note: Ran in the 2020 election as the United Democrats, winning one seat) |
| Party for Progress | 1,717 | 11.89 | 2 | 0 |
| Nation Opportunity Wealth | 1,481 | 10.25 | 2 | New |
| United St. Maarten Party | 686 | 4.75 | 0 | –2 |
| Empire Culture Empowerment Association | 292 | 2.02 | 0 | New |
| Total | 14,443 | 100.00 | 15 | 0 |
| Valid votes | 14,443 | 97.75 | | |
| Invalid votes | 332 | 2.25 | | |
| Blank votes | 0 | 0.00 | | |
| Total votes | 14,775 | 100.00 | | |
| Registered voters/turnout | 22,553 | 65.51 | | |
Source: Central Voting Bureau

== Building ==
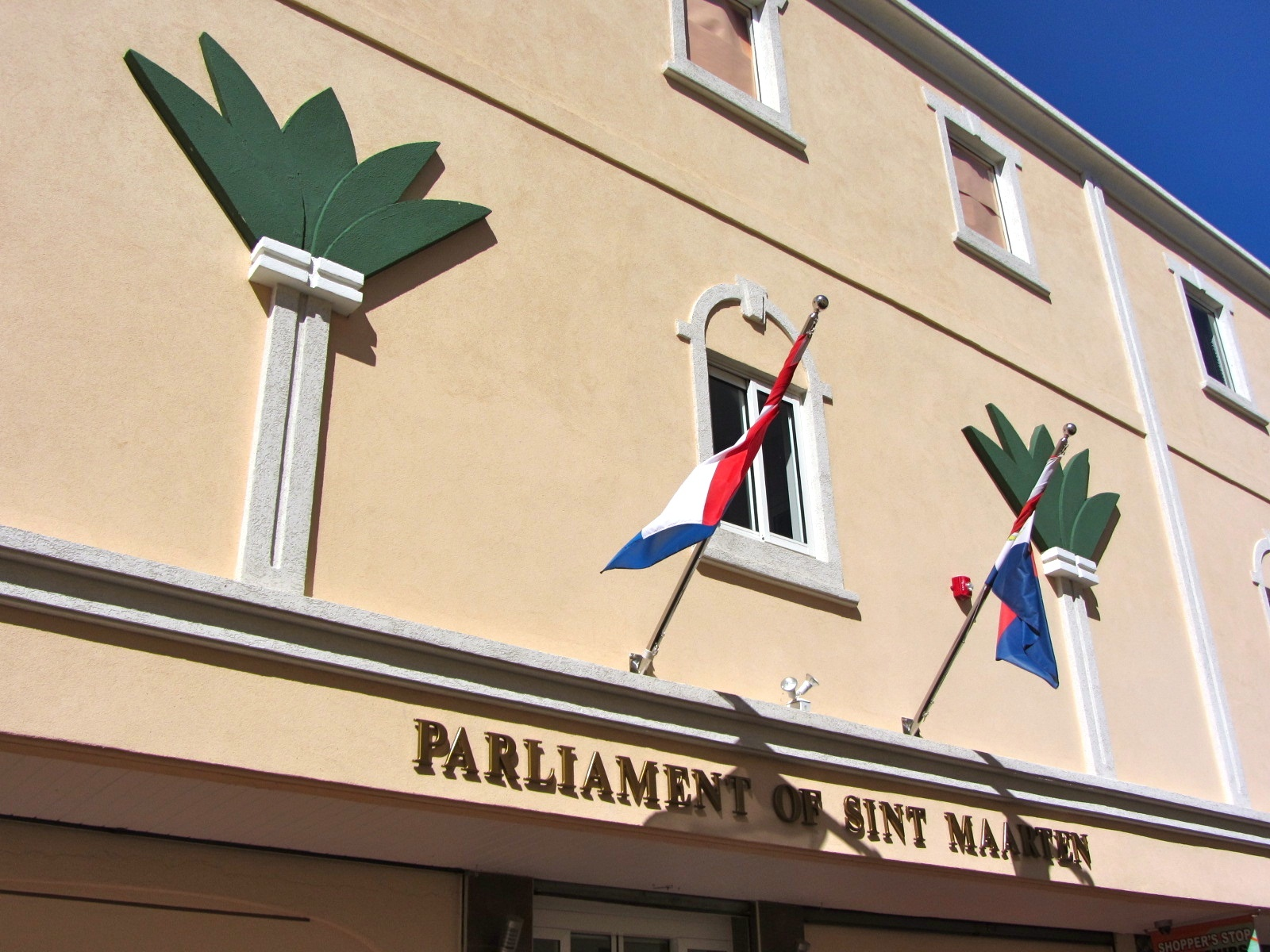
Parliament of Sint Maarten in Philipsburg, Sint Maarten

The current parliament building is located at Wilhelminastraat #1, Philipsburg, Sint Maarten.

== See also ==
- Estates of the Netherlands Antilles
- Kingdom of the Netherlands
