= United St. Maarten Party =

Political party in Sint Maarten

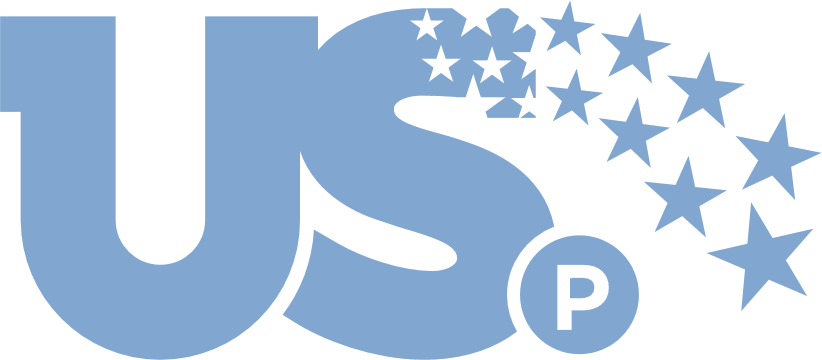
- Leader: Pamela Gordon-Carty
- Founder: Frans Richardson
- Founded: 22 December 2013; 11 years ago
- Split from: National Alliance
- Ideology: Communitarianism
- Colours: Blue
- Parliament of Sint Maarten: 0 / 15

The United St. Maarten Party (US Party) is a political party in Sint Maarten founded in 2013 by the former National Alliance deputy leader Frans Richardson. The party currently holds one seat in the parliament of Sint Maarten. In the 2014 general elections, the party obtained two seats, but its then MP-elect Leona Marlin-Romeo left the US Party and became an independent member of parliament.

In the 2020 elections, it again won two seats.

== Election results ==
=== General elections ===
Election	Leader	Votes	%	Seats	+/–	Status
2014	Frans Richardson	1,636	11.28%	2 / 15	New	Coalition
2016	Frans Richardson	2,784	19.59%	3 / 15	▲1	Coalition (2016-2017)
2016	Frans Richardson	2,784	19.59%	3 / 15	▲1	Opposition (2017-2018)
2018	Frans Richardson	1,788	13.19%	2 / 15	▼1	Opposition (2018-2019)
2018	Frans Richardson	1,788	13.19%	2 / 15	▼1	Coalition (2019-2020)
2020	Frans Richardson	1,762	13.19%	2 / 15	0	Opposition
Jan 2024	Pamela Gordon-Carty	686	4.75%	0 / 15	▼2	Extra-parliamentary
