= William Marlin =

Sint Maarten politician

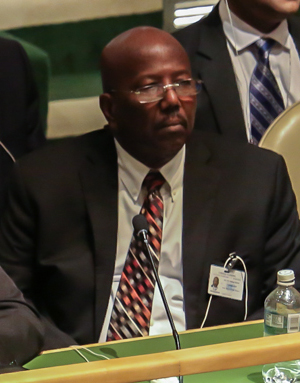

3rd Prime Minister of Sint Maarten
- In office 19 November 2015 – 24 November 2017
- Monarch: Willem-Alexander
- Governor: Eugene Holiday
- Preceded by: Marcel Gumbs
- Succeeded by: Rafael Boasman

Personal details
- Born: 21 October 1950 (age 75) Sint Maarten
- Party: National Alliance

William Marlin (born 21 October 1950) is a Sint Maarten politician who served as the 3rd Prime Minister of Sint Maarten from 2015 to 2017. Marlin was the leader of the National Alliance, and was the leader of the First and Second Marlin cabinet.

== Resignation ==
In November 2017, a motion of no confidence against Marlin and some other ministers was accepted in Parliament, due to Marlin's position in the negotiation with the Dutch government about anti fraud measures and aid funds in the aftermath of Hurricane Irma. While Marlin did tender the resignation of the cabinet, he refused to immediately step aside after a second motion of no confidence was accepted, and an instruction by the Dutch Kingdom Council of Ministers was required to force Marlin out while the rest of the cabinet would continue as caretaker cabinet until the elections.

== See also ==
- List of Sint Maarten leaders of government
