= Eugene Holiday =

1st Governor of Sint Maarten

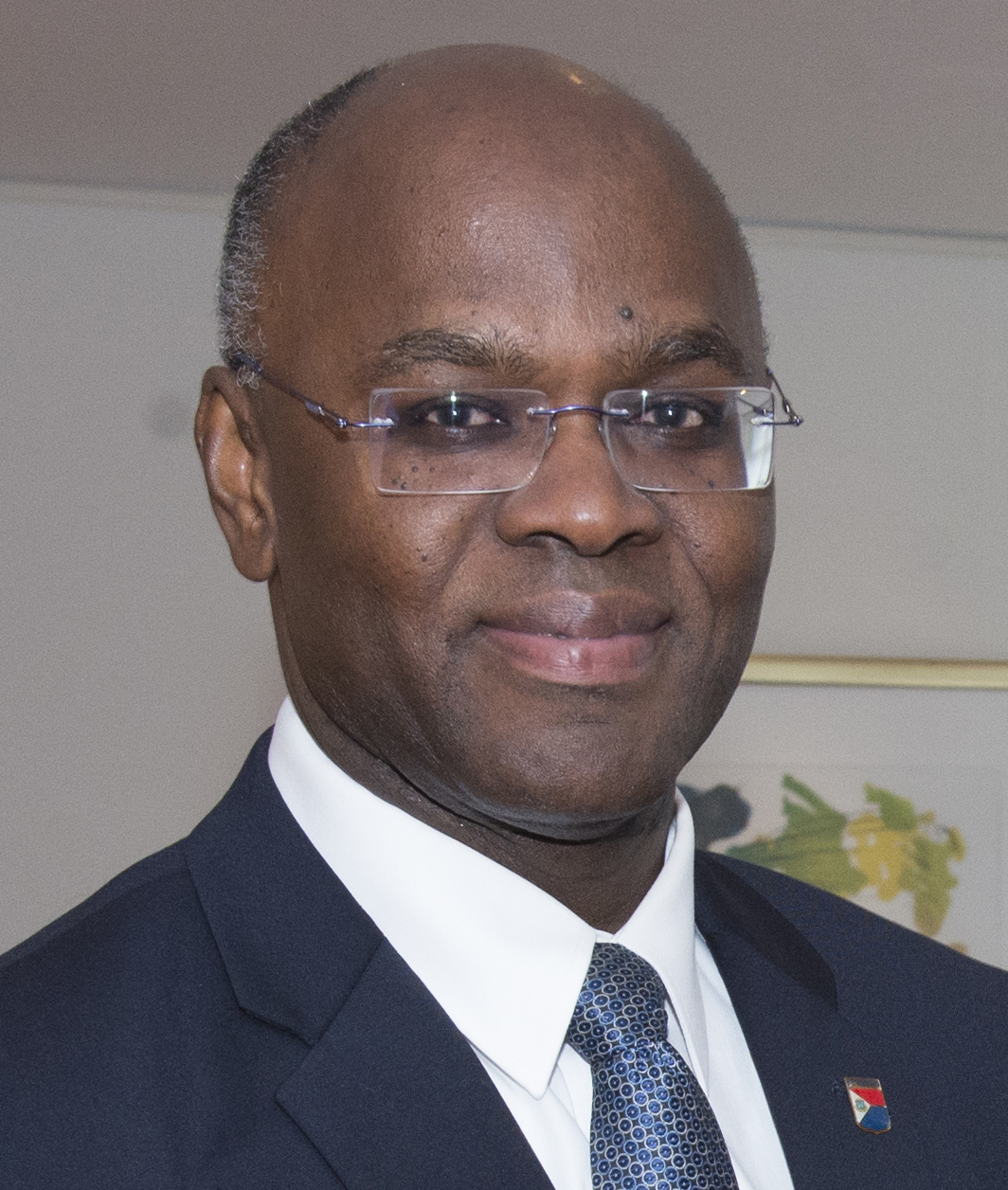

1st Governor of Sint Maarten
- In office 10 October 2010 – 10 October 2022
- Monarchs: Beatrix; Willem-Alexander
- Prime Minister: See list: Sarah Wescot-Williams Marcel Gumbs Rafael Boasman William Marlin Leona Marlin-Romeo Wycliffe Smith Silveria Jacobs
- Preceded by: office created
- Succeeded by: Ajamu Baly

Personal details
- Born: Eugene Bernard Holiday; 14 December 1962 (age 63) Philipsburg, Sint Maarten
- Spouse: Marie-Louise Hazel
- Education: Tilburg University

Eugene Bernard Holiday (born 14 December 1962) is a Sint Maarten politician and who served as the 1st Governor of Sint Maarten from 2010 to 2022. Prior to his tenure as governor he was managing director of Winair from 1995 to 1998, and Princess Juliana International Airport from 1998 to 2010.

== Early life ==
Eugene Bernard Holiday was born in Philipsburg, Sint Maarten, on 14 December 1962, as the fourth of seventh children of Eugene Bernard Holiday Sr. and Leone Cassandra Marsham. He was educated at the Oranje School, St. Joseph School, and Milton Peters College until July 1979, when he went to the Netherlands to further his education. He completed his secondary education at Canisius College, Nijmegen in 1982, and graduated with a doctorate in economics from Tilburg University in 1987.

== Career ==
Holiday moved to Curaçao after graduating from college and became an analyst and policy advisor at the Central Bank of Curaçao and Sint Maarten in September 1987. He returned to Sint Maarten in May 1995, in order to become managing director of Winair and led the company for three years. In February 1998, he was appointed as director of the Princess Juliana International Airport and held the position until 2010.

During the dissolution of the Netherlands Antilles from 2000 to 2010, Holiday was an advisor and negotiator for Sint Maarten. Queen Beatrix of the Netherlands appointed him as the first Governor of Sint Maarten on 10 October 2010. Ajamu Baly succeeded him as governor on 10 October 2022.

== Personal life ==
Holiday adheres to Methodism. He met Marie-Louise Hazel while on vacation Sint Maarten in 1985, and she came to the Netherlands to continue her education in 1986 before they married in November 1990. He was made a Commander in the Order of Orange-Nassau on 23 September 2022.

Holiday's brother, Derrick Holiday, served as police chief of the Windward Islands Police Force.

== Books ==
- Nation Building: Our Challenges, Resilience and Responsibility

== Works cited ==
=== News ===
- "Former Governor Eugene Holiday releases book on 'Nation Building'". The Daily Herald. Archived from the original on 7 May 2026.
- "Former Police Chief Holiday passes away". The Daily Herald. Archived from the original on 7 May 2026.

=== Web ===
- "About the Governor". Governor of Sint Maarten. Archived from the original on 18 March 2019.
- "Curriculum Vitae Drs. Eugene Bernard Holiday" (PDF). Governor of Sint Maarten. Archived (PDF) from the original on 24 April 2019.
- "Koninklijke onderscheiding voor vertrekkend Gouverneur Sint Maarten". Rijksoverheid. 23 September 2022. Archived from the original on 8 February 2023.
