= United Democrats (Sint Maarten) =

- Leader: Theodore Heyliger
- Deputy Leader: Sarah Wescot-Williams
- President: Stuart Johnson
- Founded: 23 November 2017
- Dissolved: 22 January 2023
- Merger of: Democratic Party (until 2023); United People's Party (until 2020)
- Succeeded by: Democratic Party; United People's Party
- Ideology: Christian left Christian democracy Social democracy
- Political position: Centre-left
- Colours

The United Democrats was a political party on Sint Maarten. The party was originally a merger between the Democratic Party (DP) and the United People's Party (UP). The UP left and re-established itself in 2020, leaving the United Democrats as essentially a direct continuation of the Democratic Party, and after the latter was reformed in 2023, the UD became essentially defunct.

In 2009, the grandson of the founder of the DP, Theo Heyliger, decided to leave the DP. Heyliger then founded the UP and contested the next three elections. In the aftermath of Hurricane Irma, which hit the island hard on 6 September 2017 and paralyzed the economy, the DP and the UP decided to merge.

On 8 January 2018 it became known that the party had the required number of statements of support and could participate in the parliamentary elections in 2018. Heyliger was the leader and Sarah Wescot-Williams was number two on the list. During the elections, the UD became the largest party in the Estates of Sint Maarten with 7 seats.

At the elections in January 2020 they lost 6 of their 7 seats, leaving them with only a single member in the Estates.
