= National Alliance (Sint Maarten) =

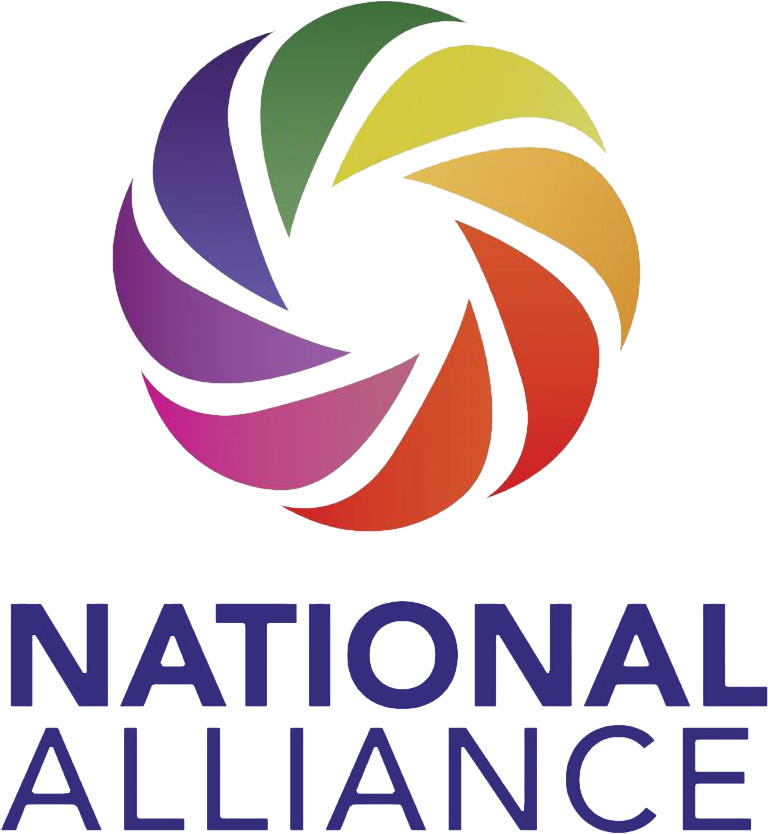
- Leader: Silveria Jacobs
- Deputy Leader: Rodolphe Samuel
- President: Cedric James
- Founded: 2002
- Merger of: Sint Maarten Patriotic Alliance; National Progressive Party
- Youth wing: NA Youth Wing
- Ideology: Social democracy
- Political position: Centre-left
- Colors: White, rainbow
- Parliament of Sint Maarten: 3 / 15

Website
- https://nationalalliance.sx/

The National Alliance (Dutch: Nationale Alliantie) is a political party in Sint Maarten, formed by the Sint Maarten Patriotic Alliance (SPA) and the National Progressive Party (NPP). It is one of main political parties within Sint Maarten. At the legislative elections in the Netherlands Antilles, 18 January 2002, the alliance won 4.8% of the popular vote of Sint Maarten and 1 out of 22 seats. At the elections in the Netherlands Antilles of 27 January 2006, it won one extra seat.

After Sint Maarten became a country within the Kingdom of the Netherlands in 2010, NA was part of the coalition of the Second Wescott-Williams Cabinet (2012–2013) and the party leader William Marlin was Prime Minister in two cabinets between 2015 and 2017 (First and Second Marlin Cabinet. After the island was hit by Hurricane Irma in September 2017, Marlin and several of his ministers received a motion of no confidence in the Sint Maarten parliament due to his role in the negotiations with the Netherlands for aid funds and the anti fraud measures. While Marlin offered his resignation after the first motion of no confidence, he did not step down after the second, and the Council of Ministers of the Kingdom eventually instructed governor Eugene Holiday to immediately accept the resignation of the prime minister and replace him. The coalition remains the same, and new elections were ordered.

On 3 January 2018 Silveria Jacobs was elected as the new party leader with Rodolphe Samuel as its deputy.

== Election results ==
=== Netherlands Antilles Island Council elections ===
Election	Leader	Votes	%	Seats	+/–
2003	William Marlin	3,943	38.78%	4 / 11	New
2007	William Marlin	5,542	41.33%	5 / 11	▲1

=== Sint Maarten general elections ===
Election	Leader	Votes	%	Seats	+/–	Status
2010	William Marlin	6,273	45.87%	7 / 15	▲2	Opposition (2010-2012)
2010	William Marlin	6,273	45.87%	7 / 15	▲2	Coalition (2012-2014)
2014	William Marlin	4,011	27.66%	4 / 15	▼3	Opposition (2014-2015)
2014	William Marlin	4,011	27.66%	4 / 15	▼3	Coalition (2015-2016)
2016	William Marlin	3,778	26.59%	5 / 15	▲1	Coalition (2016-2017)
2016	William Marlin	3,778	26.59%	5 / 15	▲1	Opposition (2017-2018)
2018	Silveria Jacobs	4,139	30.54%	5 / 15	0	Opposition (2018-2019)
2018	Silveria Jacobs	4,139	30.54%	5 / 15	0	Coalition (2019-2020)
2020	Silveria Jacobs	4,715	35.29%	6 / 15	▲1	Coalition
Jan 2024	Silveria Jacobs	3,455	23.92%	4 / 15	▼2	Opposition
Aug 2024	Silveria Jacobs	2,262	16.52%	3 / 15	▼1	TBA

== See also ==
- List of political parties in Sint Maarten
- Sint Maarten Patriotic Alliance
- National Progressive Party
- Sint Maartin
