= United People's Party (Sint Maarten) =

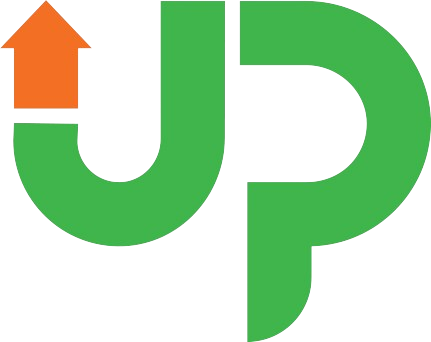
- Leader: Omar E.C. Ottley
- Founded: 24 July 2010; 15 years ago 11 April 2010; 15 years ago
- Youth wing: UP Next
- Political position: Centre-right
- National affiliation: United Democrats (2017–2020)
- Colours: Green
- Parliament of Sint Maarten: 2 / 15

Website
- UPParty.sx

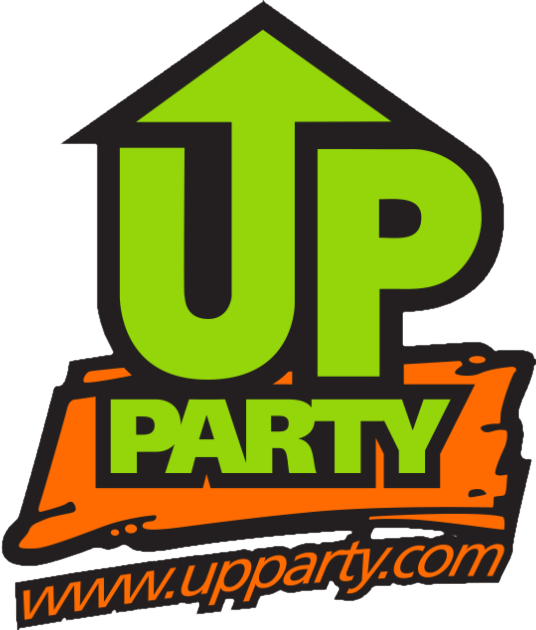
Original party logo

The United People's Party (Dutch: Verenigde Volkspartij) is a political party in Sint Maarten founded in 2010.

== UP Next ==
In 2014, the youth arm of the United People’s Party, “UP Next”, was launched at the Hard Rock Café in Phillipsburg, Sint Maarten.

== Election results ==
=== General elections ===
Election	Leader	Votes	%	Seats	+/–	Status
2010	Theo Heyliger	4,936	36.09%	6 / 15	New	Coalition (2010-2012)
2010	Theo Heyliger	4,936	36.09%	6 / 15	New	Opposition (2012-2014)
2014	Theo Heyliger	6,156	42.46%	7 / 15	▲1	Coalition (2014-2015)
2014	Theo Heyliger	6,156	42.46%	7 / 15	▲1	Opposition (2015-2016)
2016	Theo Heyliger	4,130	29.06%	5 / 15	▼2	Opposition (2016-2017)
2016	Theo Heyliger	4,130	29.06%	5 / 15	▼2	Coalition (2017-2018)
2018	Merged into United Democrats					
2020	Theo Heyliger	3,231	24.18%	4 / 15	▼3	Coalition
Jan 2024	Rolando Brison	2,814	19.48%	3 / 15	▼1	Opposition
Aug 2024	Omar Ottley	2,038	14.92%	2 / 15	▼1	TBA

== See also ==
- Claude Wathey
