= List of Curaçaoans =

This is a list of notable Curaçaoans by category. Members of this list have a close connection to Curaçao. This list also includes individuals associated with the Netherlands Antilles and the Colony of Curaçao and Dependencies.

== Arts and culture ==
Jan Gerard Palm, Rudolf Palm, John Palm and Jacobo Palm

=== Artists ===
- Lucila Engels-Boskaljon (1920-1993), Curaçaoan painter.
- Sharelly Emanuelson (born 1986), Curaçaoan filmmaker.
- Fred Fischer (1905 - 1981), Austrian photographer who lived and worked in Curaçao.
- May Henriquez (1915-1999), writer and sculptor.
- Robby Müller (1940 - 2018), cinematographer, born in Curaçao.
- Ellen Spijkstra (born 1957), ceramist from Curaçao.

=== Educators ===
- Jeanne Henriquez (born 1946), educator and historian from Curaçao.
- Annie Beatrice van der Biest Thielan Wetmore (1910 - 1997), ornithologist and benefactor born on Curaçao.

=== Musicians ===
- Izaline Calister (born 1969), singer-songwriter born and raised in Curaçao.
- Kizzy (born 1979), a singer songwriter and television raised in Curaçao.
- Tania Kross (born 1976), singer born in Curaçao.
- Wim Statius Muller (1930 - 2019), composer, pianist.
- Jacobo Palm (1887 - 1982), Curaçaoan composer.
- Jan Gerard Palm (1831-1906), Curaçaoan composer.
- John Palm (1885 - 1925), Curaçaoan composer.
- Rudolph Palm (1880 - 1950), Curaçaoan composer.
- Shirma Rouse (born 1980), Dutch singer born on Curaçao.
- Pernell Saturnino (born 1962) Curaçaoan percussionist of Berklee College of Music.
- Tony Sherman (born 1954), singer born in Willemstad.
- Sherman Smith (musician), singer-songwriter from Curaçao.

=== Performers ===
- Diana Lebacs at the University of Curaçao in 2022
  Akisha Albert, beauty queen representing Curaçao.
- Jandino Asporaat (born 1981), actor, writer and comedian born and raised in Curaçao.
- Eugènie Herlaar (1939 - 2024), Dutch news presenter born in Curaçao.
- Ruënna Mercelina, model, actress, beauty queen.
- Eline van der Velden (born c. 1985 or 1986), Dutch actress and comedian born on Curaçao.

=== Writers ===
- Frank Martinus Arion (1936 - 2015), writer from Curaçao.
- Alette Beaujon (1933 - 2001), poet and psychologist born in Curaçao.
- Joceline Clemencia (1952 - 2011), writer, feminist and activist.
- Sonia Cuales (1941 - 2018), feminist and writer born in Curaçao.
- Cola Debrot (1902 - 1981), writer and politician from Curaçao.
- Mamita Fox (born 1942), writer from Curaçao.
- Sonia Garmers (1933 - 2025), writer from Curaçao.
- Diana Lebacs (1947 - 2022), actress and writer from Curaçao.
- Tip Marugg (1923-2006), writer from Curaçao.
- Nilda Pinto (1918 - 1954), childrens writer from Curaçao.
- Myra Römer (born 1946), writer from Curaçao.
- John Rudolph Sutermeister (1803 - 1826), American lawyer and poet, born in Curaçao.
- Siny van Iterson (1919 - 2018), children's writer from Curaçao.

== Business and entrepreneurship ==
- Jahacob Curiel (1687 - 1747), Dutch merchant who lived on Curaçao.
- Abdul Nasser El Hakim (born 1960), businessperson who worked as Minister of Economic Development in Curaçao.
- Peter Hartman (born 1949), past-CEO of KLM.

== Leadership ==
=== Community leaders ===
- Rebecca Cohen Henriquez (1864 - 1935), community leader and clubwoman in Curaçao.
- Tula, leader of the 1795 slave revolt

=== Military leaders ===
- Luis Brión, admiral in the Venezuelan War of Independence.
- George Maduro (1916 - 1945), a Curaçaoan war hero and officer.
- Manuel Carlos Piar, general and competitor of Bolivar during the Venezuelan War of Independence.

=== Politics and government ===
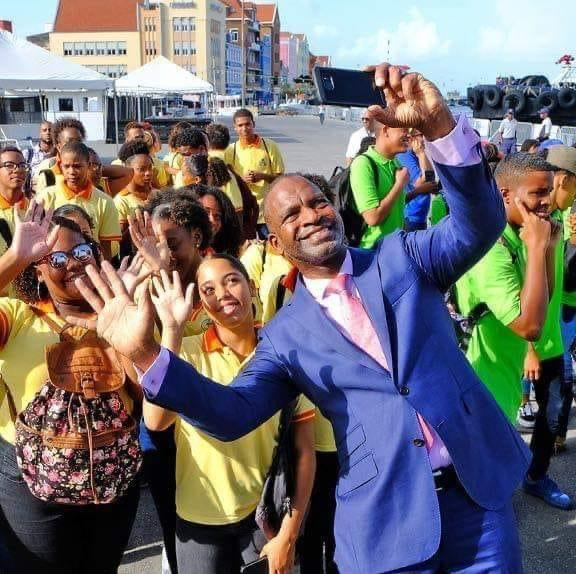
Steven Martina in 2020.

- Charetti America-Francisca (born 1981), politician who has served as Parliament Chair in Curaçao.
- Pedro Atacho (born 1960), Curaçaoan politician.
- Suzanne Camelia-Römer (born 1959), Curaçaoan politician.
- Lucina da Costa Gomez-Matheeuws (1929 - 2017), politician of the Netherlands Antilles.
- Moises Frumencio da Costa Gomez (1907 - 1966), first Prime Minister of the Netherlands Antilles.
- Daniel De Leon (1852 - 1914), labor organizer, newspaper editor and politician, born in Curaçao.
- Eunice Eisden (born 1961), Curaçaoan politician.
- Juancho Evertsz (1923 - 2008), politician of the Netherlands Antilles, died on Curaçao.
- Lucille George-Wout (born 1950), served as governor of Curaçao.
- Daniel Hodge (born 1959), Curaçaoan politician.
- Etienne van der Horst (born 1958), Curaçaoan politician.
- Zita Jesus-Leito (born 1957), Curaçaoan politician.
- George Jamaloodin (born 1967), former Minister of Finance of Curaçao.
- Efraïn Jonckheer (1917 - 1987), former prime minister of the Netherlands Antilles, born in Curacao.
- Emily de Jongh-Elhage (born 1946), politician serving both the Netherlands Antilles and Curaçao.
- Inga Rhonda King, representative to the United Nations, born in Curaçao.
- Hensley Koeiman (born 1956), Curaçaoan politician.
- Monique Koeyers-Felida (1967--2016), Curaçaoan politician.
- Ben Komproe (1942 - 2004), Curaçaoan politician.
- Ciro Kroon (1916 - 2001), Curaçaoan politician.
- Angela Altagracia de Lannoy-Willems (1913 - 1983), Curaçaoan politician.
- Maria Liberia Peters (born 1941), Prime Minister of the Netherlands Antilles.
- Mirna Louisa-Godett (born 1954), Curaçaoan politician.
- Carlson Manuel, Curaçaoan politician.
- Don Martina (1935 - 2024), Curaçaoan politician.
- Steven Martina (born 1961), Curaçaoan politician.
- Nelson Navarro (born 1949), Curaçaoan politician and jurist.
- Sheldry Osepa, Curaçaoan politician.
- Gilmar Pisas (born 1971), Prime Minister of Curaçao.
- Adèle van der Pluijm-Vrede (born 1952), Curaçaoan politician.
- Nolda Römer-Kenepa (born 1953), Curaçaoan politician and historian.
- Boy Rozendal (1928 - 2003), Curaçaoan politician.
- Gerrit Schotte (born 1974), Curaçaoan politician.
- Amerigo Thodé (1950 - 2023), Curaçaoan politician.
- Daniël Corsen, Chairperson of the World Scout Committee.

== Religion ==
- Aron Mendes Chumaceiro (1810 - 1882), Dutch rabbi of Curaçao.
- Josiah Pardo (1626 - 1684), Dutch rabbi who served on Curaçao.

== Sports ==
=== Baseball ===
Players in Major League Baseball:

- Ozzie Albies (born 1997), professional second baseman, born in Willemstad, Curaçao.
- Wladimir Balentien, professional outfielder
- Roger Bernadina, professional outfielder
- Didi Gregorius, professional shortstop
- Kenley Jansen, professional pitcher
- Andruw Jones, professional outfielder
- Jair Jurrjens, professional pitcher
- Shairon Martis, professional pitcher
- Hensley Meulens, professional baseball player and hitting coach
- Jurickson Profar, professional outfielder
- Ceddanne Rafaela, professional outfielder
- Jonathan Schoop, professional infielder
- Andrelton Simmons, professional shortstop
- Randall Simon, first baseman

=== Association Football ===
- Vurnon Anita (born 1989), a football player for Al-Orobah FC in the Saudi Arabian First Division
- Juninho Bacuna, footballer playing for Al Wehda in the Saudi Professional League.
- Leandro Bacuna (born 1991), footballer playing for FC Groningen in the Dutch Eerste Divisie.
- Roly Bonevacia, a footballer who plays for Al-Faisaly in the Saudi Professional League
- Tahith Chong, a footballer playing for Sheffield United in the English Championship.
- Juriën Gaari, footballer playing for RKC Waalwijk in the Dutch Eredivisie.
- Sontje Hansen, footballer playing for Middlesbrough FC in the English Championship.
- Raily Ignacio
- Rangelo Janga, a footballer who plays for Bnei Sakhnin in the Israeli Premier League.
- Jürgen Locadia, footballer playing for Cangzhou Mighty Lions in the Chinese Super League.
- Cuco Martina, footballer playing for NAC Breda in the Dutch Eerste Divisie
- Javier Martina
- Roshon van Eijma, footballer playing for Top Oss in the Dutch Eerste Divisie
- Jeremy Antonisse, footballer playing for Moreirense in the Portuguese Primeira Liga.
- Darryl Lachman, footballer who plays for Perth Glory in the Australian A-League.
- Armando Obispo
- Eloy Room, footballer playing for Miami FC in the American USL Championship.
- Gino van Kessel, footballer playing for MFK Zemplín Michalovce in the Slovak Niké liga.
- Jaron Vicario
- Charlton Vicento
- Jetro Willems, footballer playing for Heracles Almelo in the Dutch Eredivisie.

=== Sailing ===
- Jan Boersma Olympic Silver Medallist
- Odile van Aanholt 2024 Olympic Gold Medallist and multiple world champion for the Netherlands
- Cor van Aanholt Olympian and World Champion
- Philipine van Aanholt Olympian

=== Other sports ===
- Jemyma Betrian, professional mixed-martial-arts (MMA) fighter
- Liemarvin Bonevacia, professional sprinter
- Marc de Maar, professional cyclist
- José Flores (weightlifter) (1936-2017), weightlifter born in Curaçao.
- Churandy Martina, gold medalist 100 metres at the Pan American Games 2007
- William Millerson (1953 - 2020), Curaçaoan politician and Dutch karateka.
- Jordann Pikeur, professional kickboxer
- Jean-Julien Rojer, professional tennis player
- Roelly Winklaar, IFBB pro bodybuilder

== Other ==
- Patrick van der Eem (born 1973), convicted drug dealer born in Curaçao.
