= List of prime ministers of Queen Juliana =

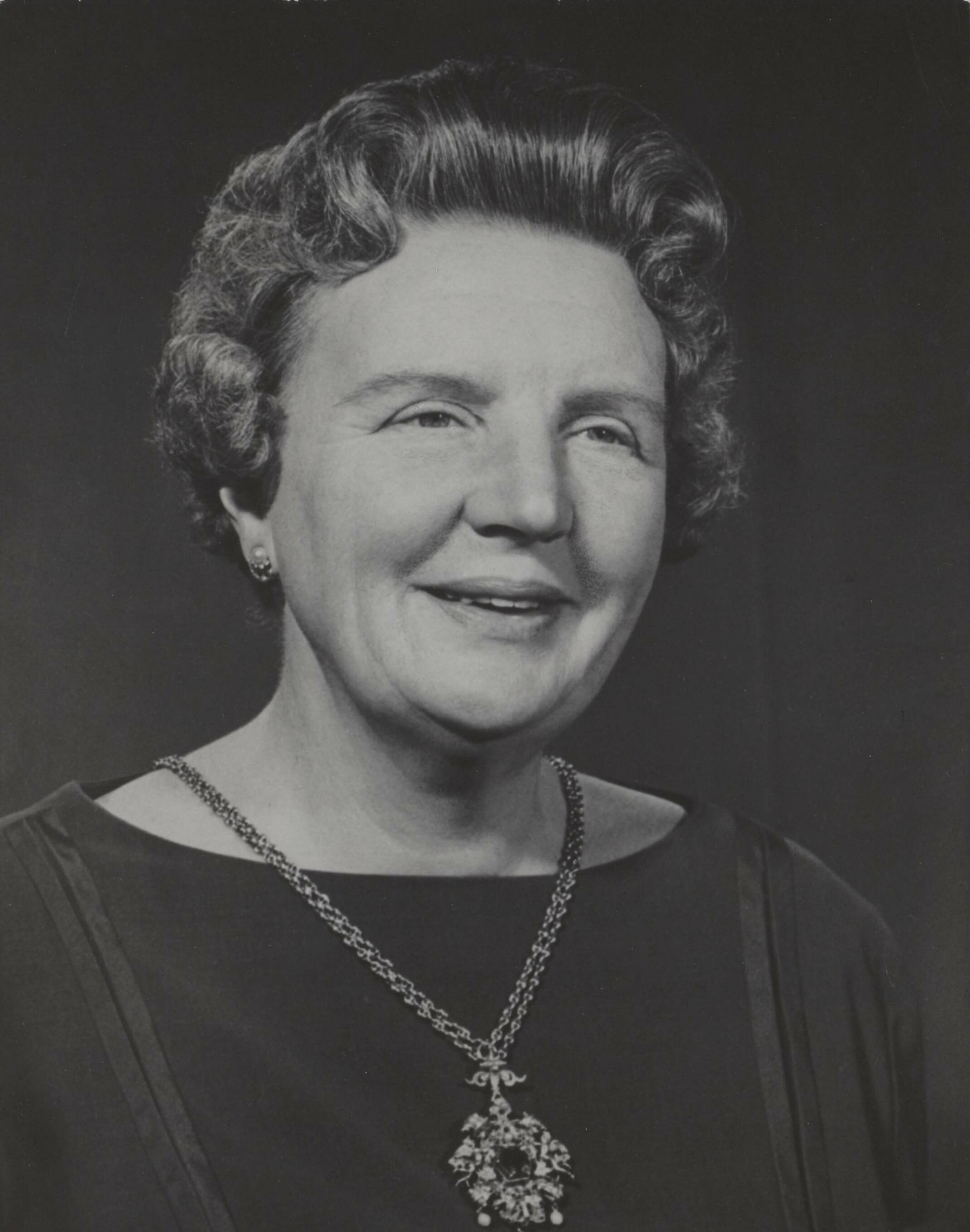
Queen Juliana in 1964

Queen Juliana was the queen of the Kingdom of the Netherlands from 4 September 1948 until her abdication on 30 April 1980. During her reign she was served by 36 prime ministers: 10 in the Netherlands, 15 in the Netherlands Antilles, and 11 in Suriname.

== List of prime ministers ==
=== Netherlands ===
1. Willem Drees (1948–1958)
2. Louis Beel (1958–1959)
3. Jan de Quay (1959–1963)
4. Victor Marijnen (1963–1965)
5. Jo Cals (1965–1966)
6. Jelle Zijlstra (1966–1967)
7. Piet de Jong (1967–1971)
8. Barend Biesheuvel (1971–1973)
9. Joop den Uyl (1973–1977)
10. Dries van Agt (1977–1982)

=== Netherlands Antilles ===
1. Moises Frumencio da Costa Gomez (1951–1954)
2. Efraïn Jonckheer (1954–1968)
3. Ciro Domenico Kroon (1968–1969)
4. Gerald C. Sprockel (1969)
5. Ernesto O. Petronia (1969–1971)
6. Ramez Jorge Isa (1971)
7. Otto R.A. Beaujon (1971–1973)
8. Juancho Evertsz (1973–1977)
9. Lucinda da Costa Gomez-Matheeuws (1977)
10. Leo A.I. Chance (1977)
11. Sylvius Gerard Marie Rozendal (1977–1979)
12. Miguel Pourier (1979)
13. Dominico Martina (1979–1984)

=== Suriname ===
1. Julius Caesar de Miranda (1949–1951)
2. Jacques Adam Drielsma (1951–1951)
3. Johannes Ate Eildert Buiskool (1951–1952)
4. Adriaan Cornelis Jasper Marius Alberga (1952)
5. Archibald Currie (1952–1955)
6. Johan Ferrier (1955–1958)
7. Severinus Désiré Emanuels (1958–1963)
8. Johan Adolf Pengel (1963–1969)
9. Arthur Johan May (1969)
10. Jules Sedney (1969–1973)
11. Henck Arron (1973–1980)
