= Evertsz cabinet =

- 8th Cabinet of the Netherlands Antilles

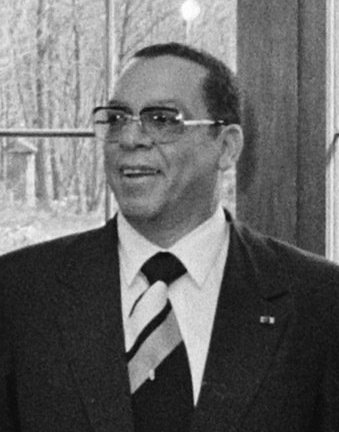
- Date formed: 20 December 1973
- Date dissolved: 14 October 1977

People and organisations
- Head of state: Juliana of the Netherlands
- Head of government: Juancho Evertsz

History
- Election: 1973 election
- Outgoing election: 1977 election
- Predecessor: Isa-Beaujon
- Successor: Rozendal

The Evertsz cabinet was the 8th cabinet of the Netherlands Antilles.

== Composition ==
The cabinet was composed as follows:

Main office-holders
Office	Name	Party	Since
Minister of General Affairs	Juancho Evertsz	PNP	20 December 1973
Minister of General Affairs	Lucinda da Costa Gomez-Matheeuws	PNP	1977
Minister of General Affairs	Leo A.I. Chance	PPA	1977
Minister of Justice	Edgar J. “Watty” Vos	MEP	20 December 1973
Minister of Finance	Efraim M. de Kort	MEP	20 December 1973
Minister of Constitutional Affairs and Education	Hendrik S. Croes	MEP	20 December 1973
Minister of Social Affairs and Labor	Rufus F. McWilliams	PNP	20 December 1973
Minister of Economic Affairs, Sports, Culture	Ciro Domenico Kroon	PNP	20 December 1973
Minister of Welfare	Miguel Pourier	UPB	20 December 1973
Minister of Public Health and Social Welfare	Lucinda da Costa Gomez-Matheeuws	PNP	20 December 1973
Minister of Traffic and Communications	Ernest Voges	DP-stm	20 December 1973
