= Isa-Beaujon cabinet =

- 7th Cabinet of the Netherlands Antilles

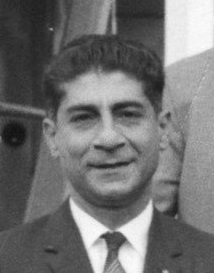
- Date formed: 12 February 1971
- Date dissolved: 20 December 1973

People and organisations
- Head of state: Juliana of the Netherlands
- Head of government: Ramez Jorge Isa; Otto R.A. Beaujon

History
- Outgoing election: 1973 election
- Predecessor: Petronia
- Successor: Evertsz

The Isa-Beaujon cabinet was the 7th cabinet of the Netherlands Antilles.

== Composition ==
The cabinet was composed as follows:

Main office-holders
Office	Name	Party	Since
Minister of General Affairs	Ramez Jorge Isa	DP-cur	12 February 1971
Minister of General Affairs	Otto R.A. Beaujon	DP-cur	27 May 1971
Minister of General Affairs	Ramez Jorge Isa	DP-cur	15 November 1972
Minister of Justice	Ernesto Petronia	PPA	12 February 1971
Minister of Justice	Hubert R. Dennert	PPA	7 July 1971
Minister of Finance	Francisco Jose Tromp ^{[Note]}	PPA	12 February 1971
Minister of Finance	Hubert R. Dennert	PPA	16 May 1973
Minister of Education and Cultural Affairs	Otto R.A Beaujon	DP-cur	12 February 1971
Minister of Education and Cultural Affairs	Ricardo Elhage	DP-cur	7 July 1971
Minister of Labor and Social Affairs	Frank J. Pijpers	DP-cur	12 February 1971
Minister of Labor and Social Affairs	Rufus F. McWilliams	PNP	7 July 1971
Minister of Public Health and Social Welfare	Otto R.A Beaujon	DP-cur	12 February 1971
Minister of Public Health and Social Welfare	Lucinda da Costa Gomez-Matheeuws	PNP	7 July 1971
Minister of Welfare	Hubert R. Dennert	PPA	12 February 1971
Minister of Welfare	Frank J. Pijpers	DP-cur	7 July 1971
Minister of Economic Affairs	D. Guzman Croes	AVP	12 February 1971
Minister of Traffic and Communications	Leo A.I. Chance	PPA	12 February 1971

^{Note} Francisco Jose Tromp was appointed Lieutenant governor of Aruba.
