= Third Jonckheer cabinet =

Cabinet of the Netherlands Antilles

- 3rd Cabinet of the Netherlands Antilles

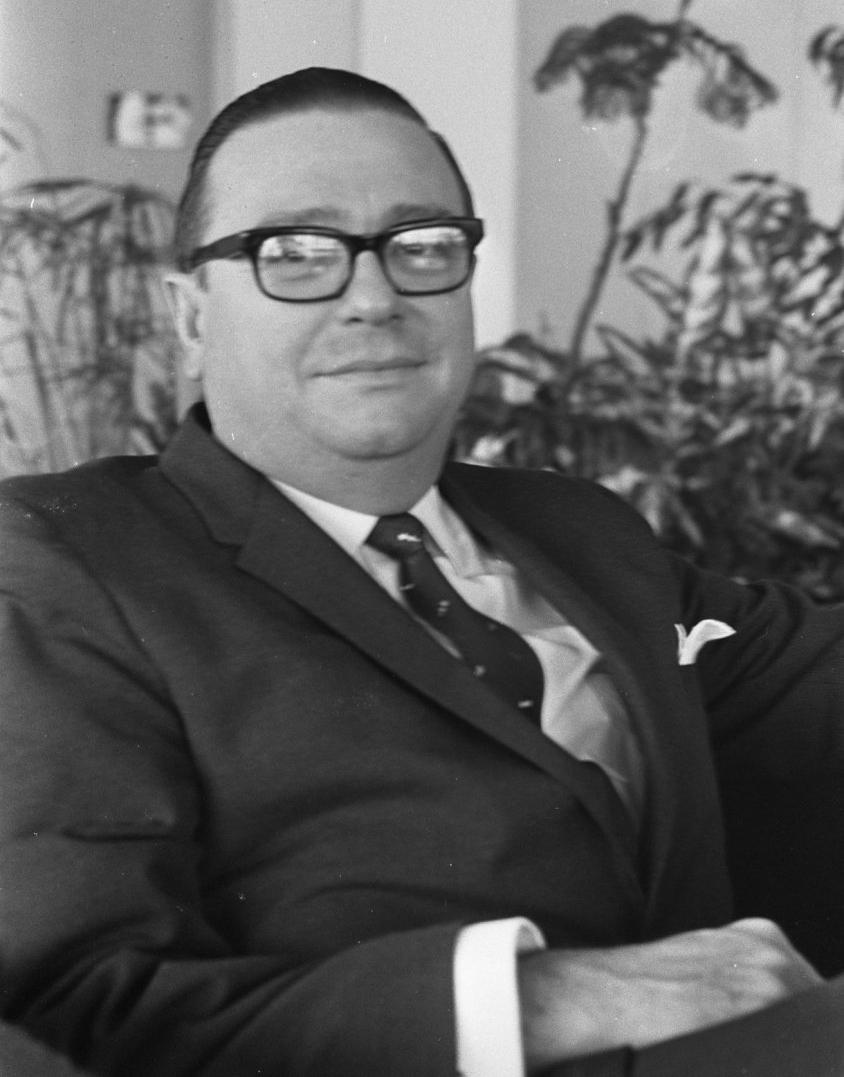
- Date formed: 2 November 1962
- Date dissolved: 1966

People and organisations
- Head of state: Juliana of the Netherlands
- Head of government: Efrain Jonckheer

History
- Election: 1962 election
- Outgoing election: 1966 election
- Predecessor: Jonckheer II
- Successor: Jonckheer-Kroon

The Third Jonckheer cabinet was the 3rd cabinet of the Netherlands Antilles.

== Composition ==
The cabinet was composed as follows:

Main office-holders
Office	Name	Party	Since
Minister of General Affairs	Efrain Jonckheer	DP-cur	2 November 1962
Minister of Justice	Ramez Jorge Isa	DP-cur	2 November 1962
Minister of Finance, Welfare	Oscar S. Henriquez	PPA	2 November 1962
Minister of Finance, Welfare	Ernesto O. Petronia	PPA	24 April 1963
Minister of Social Affairs, Economic Affairs, Public Health	Ciro Domenico Kroon	DP-cur	2 November 1962
Minister of Education, Culture	Ernesto O. Petronia	PPA	2 November 1962
Minister of Traffic and Communications	Ernesto O. Petronia	PPA	2 November 1962
Minister of Traffic and Communications	Julius R.L. Beaujon	PPA	9 July 1963
