= Petronia (disambiguation) =

Petronia may refer to:

- Petronia, the monospecific genus of the rock sparrow, named after the Italian;
- Petronia gens, an ancient Rome family;
- Petronia City, a planned location in Ghana;
- Petronia cabinet, a 1969-1971 government in the Netherlands Antilles led by:
  - Ernesto Petronia, Curaçao-born Aruban businessman and politician
- Petronian notation and Petronian motets, in Medieval music
