= Beaujon =

Beaujon may refer to:

== People ==
- Aletta Beaujon (1933–2001), Dutch poet and psychologist
- Antony Beaujon (c. 1762–1805), Dutch and British colonial administrator
- Nicolas Beaujon (1718–1786), French banker
- Otto Beaujon (1915–1984), Prime Minister of the Netherlands Antilles

== Other ==
- Beaujon Aircraft, an American aircraft design company
- Beaujon Hospital, a hospital in Clichy, Paris, France
