= First Ys cabinet =

- 22nd Cabinet of the Netherlands Antilles
- Date formed: 3 June 2002
- Date dissolved: 22 July 2003

People and organisations
- Head of state: Beatrix of the Netherlands
- Head of government: Etienne Ys

History
- Election: 2002 election
- Predecessor: Pourier III
- Successor: Godett

The First Ys cabinet was the 22nd cabinet of the Netherlands Antilles.

== Composition ==
The cabinet was composed as follows:

Main office-holders
Office	Name	Party	Since
Minister of General Affairs and Foreign Affairs	Etienne Ys	PAR	3 June 2002
Minister of the Interior, Labor and Social Affairs	Russell Voges	DP-stm	3 June 2002
Minister of Justice	Norberto Ribeiro	PAR	3 June 2002
Minister for the National Recovery Plan and Economic Affairs	Erroll Cova	PLKP	3 June 2002
Minister of Education, Youth, Culture, and Sports	Emily de Jongh-Elhage	PAR	3 June 2002
Minister of Traffic and Communications	Herbert Domacasse	UPB	3 June 2002
Minister of Finance	Ersilia de Lannooy	PNP	3 June 2002
Minister of Public Health and Hygiene	Islelly Pikerie	PNP	3 June 2002
