= Second Pourier cabinet =

- 19th Cabinet of the Netherlands Antilles

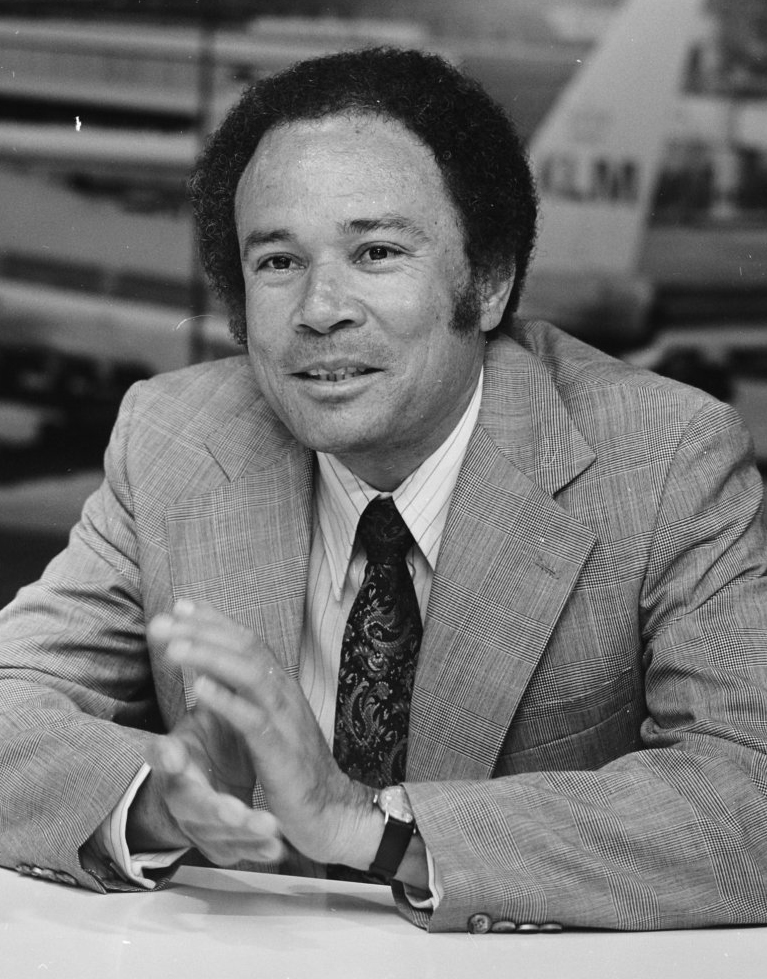
- Date formed: 31 March 1994
- Date dissolved: 15 June 1998

People and organisations
- Head of state: Beatrix of the Netherlands
- Head of government: Miguel Pourier

History
- Election: 1994 election
- Predecessor: Paula
- Successor: Camelia-Römer

The Second Pourier cabinet was the 19th Cabinet of the Netherlands Antilles.

== Composition ==
The cabinet was composed as follows:

Main office-holders
| Office | Name | Party | Since |
|---|---|---|---|
| Minister of General Affairs and Constitutional Affairs | Miguel Pourier | PAR | 31 March 1994 |
| Minister of Traffic and Communications | Leo Chance | SPA | 31 March 1994 |
| Minister of Traffic and Communications | Danny Hassell | WIPM | March 1998 |
| Minister of Justice | Pedro Atacho ^{[Res]} | PAR | 31 March 1994 |
| Minister of Justice | Mike Willem | PAR | March 1998 |
| Minister of Finance | Etienne Ys ^{[Note]} | PAR | 31 March 1994 |
| Minister of Finance | Harold Henriquez | PAR | 10 July 1995 |
| Minister of Labor and Social Affairs | Jeffrey Corion ^{[Res]} | PAR | 31 March 1994 |
| Minister of Labor and Social Affairs | Mike Willem | PAR | 1996 |
| Minister of Public Health | Stanley Inderson ^{[Res]} | MAN | 31 March 1994 |
| Minister of Public Health | Beatriz Doran-Scoop | MAN | August 1996 |
| Minister of Development Aid | Edith Strauss-Marsera | PDB | 31 March 1994 |
| Minister of Development Aid | Martha Dijkhoff | PAR | December 1997 |
| Minister of Education | Martha Dijkhoff | PAR | 31 March 1994 |
| State Secretary of General Affairs | Harold Arends | PAR | 5 April 1994 |
| State Secretary of Constitutional Affairs | Leonora Sneek-Gibbs | DP-ste | 11 April 1994 |
| State Secretary of Constitutional Affairs | Ralph Berkel | DP-ste | 2 January 1997 |
| State Secretary of Economic Affairs | Danny Hassell | WIPM | 31 March 1994 |

^{Note} Etienne Ys was appointed Commissioner of finance for the Island Territory of Curaçao.
^{Res} A parliamentary report on the state of the prison system led Atacho to resign on 24 March 1998.
^{Res} In 1996 Inderson resigned after a faulty water filter in one of Curaçao's hospitals caused the death of nine dialysis patients.
^{Res} Corion was nominated as a member of the Pourier cabinet by the Curaçao trade union movement. He resigned on 16 July 1996 after the trade union became dissatisfied with his performance.
