= Petronia cabinet =

- 6th Cabinet of the Netherlands Antilles

- Date formed: 12 December 1969
- Date dissolved: 12 February 1971

People and organisations
- Head of state: Juliana of the Netherlands
- Head of government: Ernesto Petronia

History
- Election: 1969 election
- Predecessor: Sprockel
- Successor: Isa-Beaujon

The Petronia cabinet was the 6th cabinet of the Netherlands Antilles.

== Composition ==
The cabinet was composed as follows:

Main office-holders
| Office | Name | Party | Since |
|---|---|---|---|
| Minister of General Affairs | Ernesto Petronia | PPA | 12 December 1969 |
| Minister of Finance | Sylvius Gerard Marie Rozendal | DP-cur | 12 December 1969 |
| Minister of Education | Otto R.A. Beaujon | DP-cur | 12 December 1969 |
| Minister of Traffic and Communications | Leo A.I. Chance | PPA | 12 December 1969 |
| Minister of Economic Affairs | Frank J. Pijpers | DP-cur | 12 December 1969 |
| Minister of Welfare | Frank J. Pijpers | DP-cur | 12 December 1969 |
| Minister of Welfare | Francisco Jose Tromp | PPA | 16 July 1970 |
| Minister of Social Affairs | Amador Poulo Nita ^{[Note]} | FOL | 12 December 1969 |
| Minister of Social Affairs | Ernesto Petronia | PPA | 24 June 1970 |
| Minister of Social Affairs | Rufus F. McWilliam | PNP | 16 July 1970 |
| Minister of Justice | Ernesto Petronia | PPA | 12 December 1969 |
| Minister of Justice | Francisco Jose Tromp | PPA | 18 April 1970 |
| Minister of Justice | Ernesto Petronia | PPA | 16 July 1970 |
| Minister of Public Health | Amador Poulo Nita ^{[Note]} | FOL | 12 December 1969 |
| Minister of Public Health | Ernesto Petronia | PPA | 24 June 1970 |
| Minister of Public Health | Lucinda da Costa Gomez-Matheeuws | PNP | 16 July 1970 |
| Minister of Labor | Hilberto M. Thomas | FOL | 5 September 1970 |

^{Note} Nita died unexpectedly on 17 June 1970.
