= Jonckheer-Kroon cabinet =

- 4th Cabinet of the Netherlands Antilles

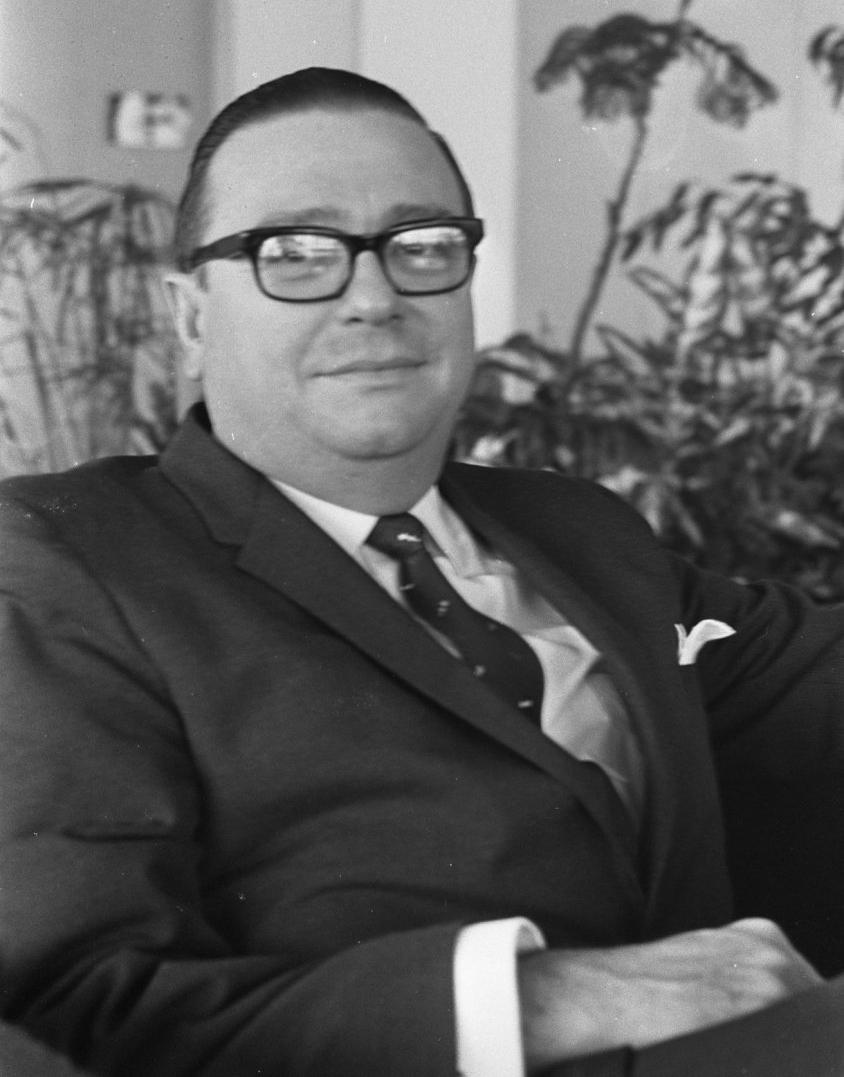
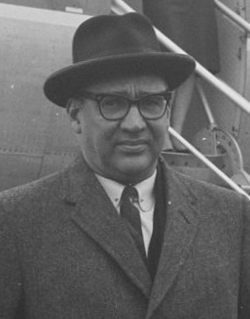
- Date formed: 12 October 1966
- Date dissolved: 1969

People and organisations
- Head of state: Juliana of the Netherlands
- Head of government: Efraïn Jonckheer; Ciro Domenico Kroon

History
- Election: 1966 election
- Predecessor: Jonckheer III
- Successor: Sprockel

The Jonckheer-Kroon cabinet, also called the Fourth Jonckheer cabinet was the 4th cabinet of the Netherlands Antilles.

== Composition ==
The cabinet was composed as follows:

Main office-holders
Office	Name	Party	Since
Minister of General Affairs	Efraïn Jonckheer	DP-cur	12 October 1966
Minister of General Affairs	Ciro Domenico Kroon	DP-cur	14 February 1968
Minister of Justice	Ramez Jorge Isa	DP-cur	12 October 1966
Minister of Finance	Francisco Jose Tromp	PPA	12 October 1966
Minister of Constitutional Affairs and Education	Hendrik S. Croes	MEP	12 October 1966
Minister of Social Affairs and Economic Affairs	Ciro Domenico Kroon	DP-cur	12 October 1966
Minister of Social Affairs and Economic Affairs	Juan A.O. Bikker	DP-cur	14 February 1968
Minister of Welfare	Efraïn Jonckheer	DP-cur	12 October 1966
Minister of Welfare	Juan A.O. Bikker	DP-cur	8 December 1966
Minister of Public Health	Ciro Domenico Kroon	DP-cur	12 October 1966
Minister of Public Health	Ernest Voges	PNP	16 August 1967
Minister of Traffic and Communications	Julius R.L. Beaujon	PPA	12 October 1966
