= First Pourier cabinet =

- 10th Cabinet of the Netherlands Antilles

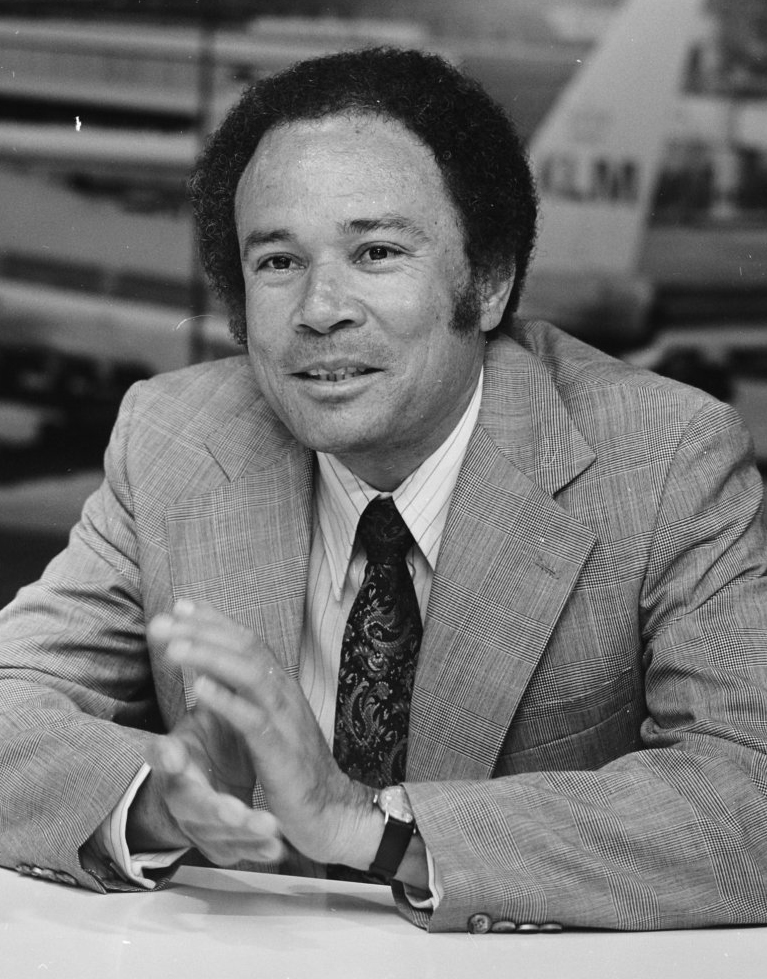
- Date formed: 30 July 1979
- Date dissolved: 16 November 1979

People and organisations
- Head of state: Juliana of the Netherlands
- Head of government: Miguel Pourier

History
- Outgoing election: 1979 election
- Predecessor: Rozendal
- Successor: Martina I

The First Pourier cabinet was the 10th cabinet of the Netherlands Antilles.

== Composition ==
The cabinet was composed as follows:

Main office-holders
| Office | Name | Party | Since |
|---|---|---|---|
| Minister of General Affairs and Development Cooperation | Miguel Pourier | UPB | 30 July 1979 |
| Minister of Finance, Labor and Social Affairs, Public Health and Environmental Care | Marco Jesus de Castro | MAN | 30 July 1979 |
| Minister of Justice and Constitutional Affairs | Henri R. Fingal | MEP | 30 July 1979 |
| Minister of Education, Sports, Culture, Recreation and Social Welfare and Youth Affairs | Jacques P. Veeris | MAN | 30 July 1979 |
| Minister of Economic Affairs, Traffic and Communications | Arsenio C. Yarzagaray | MEP | 30 July 1979 |
