= Rozendal cabinet =

- 9th Cabinet of the Netherlands Antilles

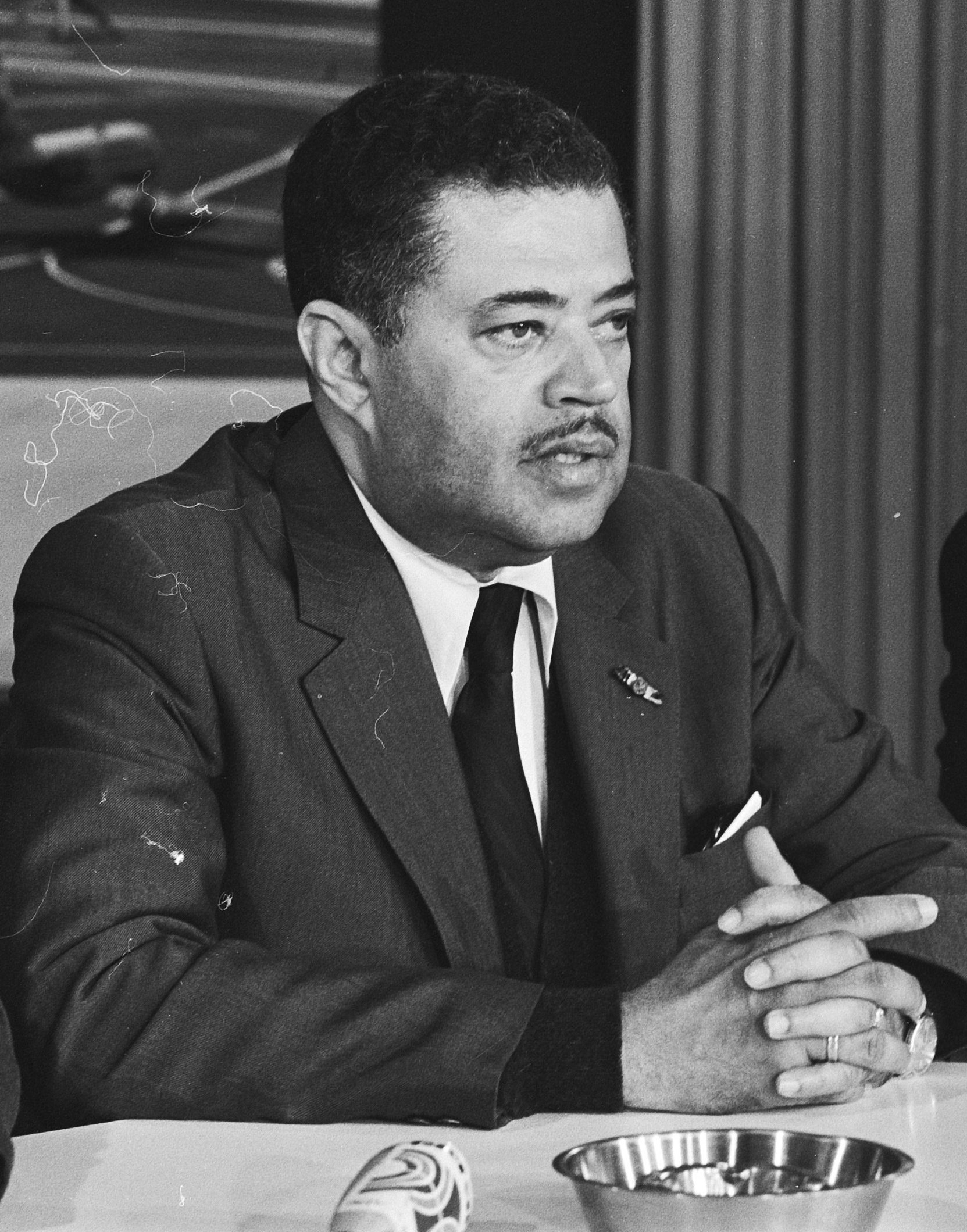
- Date formed: 14 October 1977
- Date dissolved: 30 July 1979

People and organisations
- Head of state: Juliana of the Netherlands
- Head of government: Sylvius Rozendal

History
- Election: 1977 election
- Outgoing election: 1979 election
- Predecessor: Evertsz
- Successor: Pourier I

The Rozendal cabinet was the 9th cabinet of the Netherlands Antilles.

== Composition ==
The cabinet was composed as follows:

Main office-holders
Office	Name	Party	Since
Minister of General Affairs	Sylvius Gerard Marie Rozendal	DP-cur	14 October 1977
Minister of Social Welfare, Youth Affairs, Sports, Culture and Recreation	Stanley N. Rogers	DP-stm	31 October 1977
Minister of Justice	Leo A.I. Chance	PPA	14 October 1977
Minister of Finance	Max Croes	PPA	14 October 1977
Minister of Education	Faustina M. Frank	PPA	14 October 1977
Minister of Economic Affairs	Maurits J. Larmonie	PNP	19 October 1977
Minister of Social Affairs and Labor	Hubert L. Spencer	DP-cur	14 October 1977
Minister of Welfare	Miguel A. Pourier	UPB	14 October 1977
Minister of Traffic and Communications	Alfredo R. Winklaar	PNP	19 October 1977
Minister of Public Health	Gualberto Hernandez	DP-cur	14 October 1977
