= Godett cabinet =

- 23rd Cabinet of the Netherlands Antilles
- Date formed: 22 July 2003
- Date dissolved: 4 June 2004

People and organisations
- Head of state: Beatrix of the Netherlands
- Head of government: Ben Komproe; Mirna Louisa-Godett

History
- Predecessor: Ys I
- Successor: Ys II

The Godett cabinet was the 23rd Cabinet of the Netherlands Antilles.

== Composition ==
The cabinet was composed as follows:

Main office-holders
Office	Name	Party	Since
Minister of General Affairs	Ben Komproe	FOL	22 July 2003
Minister of General Affairs	Mirna Louisa-Godett	FOL	11 August 2003
Minister of Constitutional Affairs and Interior Affairs	Russell Voges	DP-stm	24 July 2003
Minister of Constitutional Affairs and Interior Affairs	Erroll Cova	PLKP	28 July 2003
Minister of Constitutional Affairs and Interior Affairs	Richard Gibson	NA	3 February 2004
Minister of Traffic and Communications	Richard Salas	FOL	22 July 2003
Minister of Finance	Ersilia de Lannooy	PNP	22 July 2003
Minister of Economic Affairs	Erroll Cova	PLKP	22 July 2003
Minister of Public Health and Social Development	Joan Theodora-Brewster	PNP	22 July 2003
Minister of Education	Herbert Domacasse ^{[Note]}	UPB	22 July 2003
Minister of Education	Ersilia de Lannooy	PNP	December 2003
Minister of Education	Reynolds A. Oleana	PDB	3 February 2004
Minister of Justice	Ben Komproe	FOL	22 July 2003
Minister of Justice	Mirna Louisa-Godett acting	FOL	2004

^{Note} Herbert Domacasse appointed Lieutenant governor of Bonaire
