= Third Pourier cabinet =

- 21st Cabinet of the Netherlands Antilles

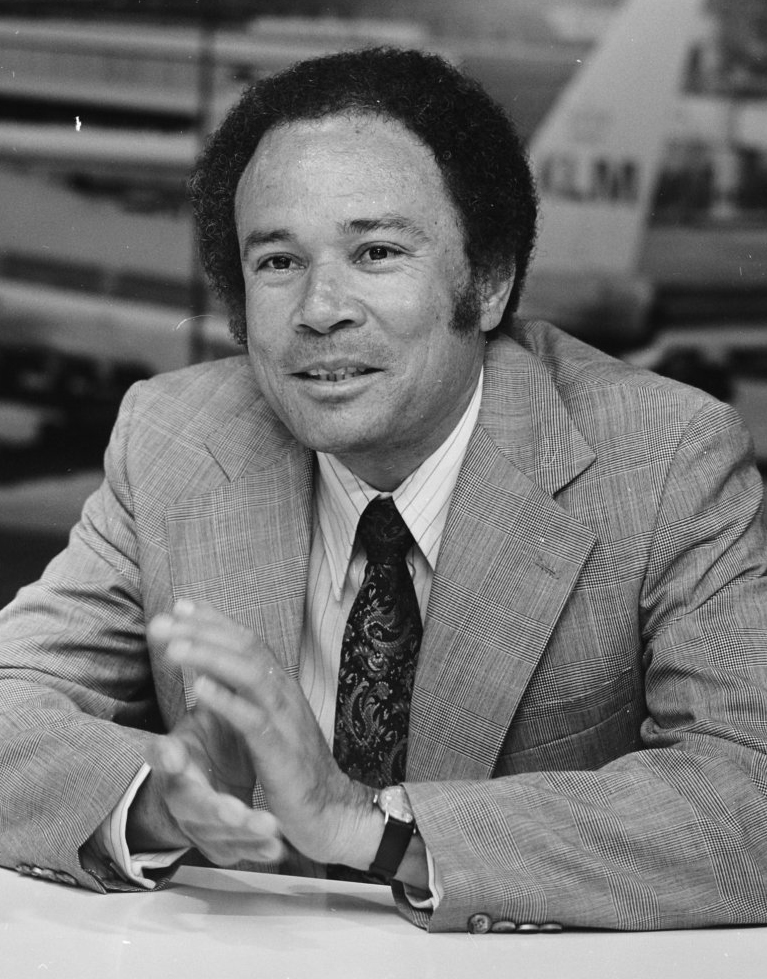
- Date formed: 8 November 1999
- Date dissolved: 3 June 2002

People and organisations
- Head of state: Beatrix of the Netherlands
- Head of government: Miguel Pourier

History
- Outgoing election: 2002 election
- Predecessor: Camelia-Römer II
- Successor: Ys I

The Third Pourier cabinet was the 21st cabinet of the Netherlands Antilles.

== Composition ==
The cabinet was composed as follows:

Main office-holders
Office	Name	Party	Since
Minister of General Affairs and Development Cooperation	Miguel Pourier	PAR	8 November 1999
Minister of the Interior, Labor and Social Affairs	Lucille George-Wout	PAR	8 November 1999
Minister of Justice	Rutsel Martha	PNP	8 November 1999
Minister for the National Recovery Plan and Economic Affairs	Suzanne Camelia-Römer	PNP	8 November 1999
Minister of Education, Youth, Culture, and Sports	Stanley Lamp	MAN	8 November 1999
Minister of Traffic and Communications	Maurice Adriaens	FOL	8 November 1999
Minister of Finance	Russell Voges	DP-stm	8 November 1999
Minister of Public Health and Hygiene	Laurenso Abraham	PDB	8 November 1999
