= 1962 Netherlands Antilles general election =

General elections were held in the Netherlands Antilles on 4 June 1962.

The 22 seats in the Estates of the Netherlands Antilles consisted of twelve for Curaçao, eight for Aruba, one for Bonaire and one for the SSS Islands.

== Results ==
Party	Island	Votes	%	Seats
National People's Party	Curaçao	22,526	32.56	7
Democratic Party	Curaçao	18,953	27.40	5
Aruban Patriotic Party	Aruba	10,613	15.34	5
Aruban People's Party	Aruba	6,289	9.09	3
Constructive People's Party	Curaçao	2,529	3.66	0
Aruban People's Union	Aruba	1,488	2.15	0
Bonaire Democratic Party	Bonaire	1,453	2.10	1
Radical People's Party	Curaçao	1,259	1.82	0
United Progressive Bonairean Party	Bonaire	1,121	1.62	0
Democratic Party	SSS Islands	893	1.29	1
Windward Island's Progressive Party	SSS Islands	747	1.08	0
Curaçaoan People's Union	Curaçao	603	0.87	0
Aruban Labour Front	Aruba	372	0.54	0
Windward Island's Progressive Party	Aruba	329	0.48	0
Total		69,175	100.00	22

=== Curaçao ===
Population: 127,164 (31 December 1961)
Valid votes: 45,870
Seats: 12
Average valid votes per seat: 3,822.5

- National People's Party (NVP) / COP: 22,526 (7)
- Democratic Party: 18,953 (5)
- Constructive People's Party: 2,529 (0)
- Radical People's Party: 1,259 (0)
- Curaçaoan People's Union: 603 (0)

Members of the Estates of the Netherlands Antilles for Curaçao:

1. S.D. Abbad
2. J.A.O. Bikker
3. W. de Boer, in 1964 succeeded by G.E.A. Booi
4. H.L. Braam, in 1964 succeeded by P.A. van der Veen
5. C.C. Campman-Zielinski
6. C.E. Cathalina, in 1965 succeeded by R. Elhage
7. M.F. da Costa Gomez, in 1963 succeeded by A.F.M. Torres
8. C.H.W. Hueck
9. H.G.M. Pieters Kwiers, in 1964 succeeded by Chr. van der Mark
10. B.Ph. Römer
11. L.C. van der Linde-Helmijr
12. Ch.E.W. Voges

=== Aruba ===
Population: 57,347 (31 December 1961)
Valid votes: 19,091
Seats: 8
Average valid votes per seat: 2,386.375

- Aruban Patriotic Party: 10,613 (5)
- Aruban People's Party: 6,289 (3)
- Aruban People's Union: 1,488 (0)
- Aruban Labour Front: 372 (0)
- Windward Island's Progressive Party: 329 (0)

Members of the Estates of the Netherlands Antilles for Aruba:

1. D.G. Croes
2. M. Croes
3. O. Croes
4. C.A. Eman
5. J. Erasmus
6. E.R. Finck
7. M. Henriquez
8. D.C. Mathew, in 1964 succeeded by J. Geerman

=== Bonaire ===
Population: 5,896 (31 December 1961)
Valid votes: 2,574
Seats: 1

- Bonaire Democratic Party: 1,453 (1; L.A. Abraham)
- United Progressive Bonairean Party: 1,121 (0)

=== SSS Islands ===
Population: 4,985 (31 December 1961, Sint Maarten: 2,928; Sint Eustatius: 1,044; Saba: 1,013)
Valid votes: 1,640
Seats: 1

#	Candidate	Total per list	Votes	Result
Democratic Party
1	A.C. Wathey	893	496	Elected
2	Th.V.H. Hassel	893	171	-
3	C.A. Woodley	893	141	-
4	G.B. Halley	893	55	-
5	C.C. Peterson	893	2	-
6	W.C. Anslijn	893	28	-
Windward Island's Progressive Party
1	H.I. Lopes	747	332	-
2	Ch.E.W. Voges	747	102	-
3	H.C. Every	747	255	-
4	A.T. Donker	747	13	-
5	A. Smidt	747	5	-
6	C.J. Hazel	747	40	-

== Aftermath ==
On 2 November 1962 the Third Jonckheer cabinet was formed.
