= Ciro Kroon =

Curaçao politician and businessman

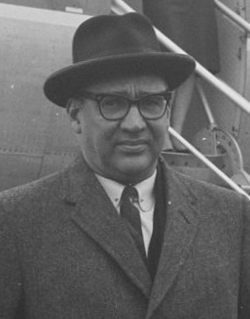
- Kroon (1963)

Minister of Economic Affairs, Sports and Culture
- In office 20 November 1973 – 14 October 1977

Prime Minister of the Netherlands Antilles
- In office 15 February 1968 – June 1969
- Monarch: Queen Juliana
- Preceded by: Efraïn Jonckheer
- Succeeded by: Gerald Sprockel a.i.

Minister of Social and Economic Affairs
- In office November 1957 – 14 February 1968

Personal details
- Born: Ciro Domenico Kroon; 31 January 1916 Curaçao
- Died: 9 June 2001 (aged 85) Curaçao
- Party: Democratic Party of Curaçao (1944–1970); Movimento pa adelanto Social Antiyano (1970–)
- Occupation: politician and businessman

Ciro Domenico Kroon (31 January 1916 – 9 June 2001) was an Curaçao politician and businessman. He served as Minister of Social and Economic Affairs from 1957 until 1968, and Prime Minister of the Netherlands Antilles from 1968 until 1969. The 1969 Curaçao uprising caused the collapse of his government.

== Biography ==
Kroon was born on 31 January 1916 in Curaçao. After finishing high school, he worked in trade. In 1942, he joined the civil service in the Department of Social and Economic Affairs. In 1944, he was one of the founders of the Democratic Party of Curaçao. In 1945, he was a candidate for the Estates of Curaçao and Dependencies, but did not get elected.

In 1949, Kroon was elected to the Estates. On 16 June 1951, he became a member of the island council of Curaçao, and served until 1957. In 1956, he first served as acting Lieutenant governor of Curaçao. In November 1957, he was appointed Minister of Social and Economic Affairs.

== Prime minister ==
In January 1968, prime minister Efraïn Jonckheer announced his intention to retire from active politics, and named Kroon as his successor. On 15 February, Kroon became Prime Minister of the Netherlands Antilles. The same day, he wanted to drive to the airport to say goodbye to Jonckheer, however he was involved in a traffic accident with a bus, and was hospitalised with a concussion.

On the outside, Curaçao appeared to be in great shape. It had one of the highest per capita incomes, a 99.5% literacy rate, a tourist friendly capital with luxury hotels and many duty-free shops, however Royal Dutch Shell, the largest employer, had laid off 2,000 workers. About 20% of the population, mainly of African descent, was unemployed, and many were living in slums on the edge of Willemstad. On the other hand, the mainly Caucasian management was living in the segregated and gated villa wards of Julianadorp and Emmastad.

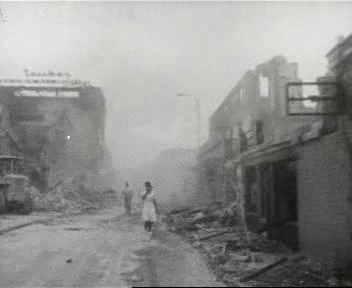
Aftermath of the 1969 riot

Royal Dutch Shell announced using plumbers of subcontractor Werkspoor Caribbean (WESCAR), where the employees received significant lower wages. A strike was called for the end of May by the unions. On 30 May 1969, the strikers were joined by disgruntled personnel of Texas Instruments, and a march was organised to the centre of Willemstad which escalated in a riot where houses were set on fire, and shops were looted.

The police were unable to handle the situation, prime minister Kroon could not located, governor Cola Debrot was in New York, therefore, Ronchi Isa, Minister of Justice, called in the Netherlands Marine Corps. The riot ended when it was announced that Shell and WESCAR had given into the demands, and the marines left on 6 June. The riot had resulted in two deaths, 69 wounded, 53 buildings were destroyed, and 190 looted. Damages were estimated at US$40 million. The government of the Netherlands Antilles announced its resignation, and an ad interim government was formed headed by Gerald Sprockel which would act as a place holder until the 1969 elections. Ernesto Petronia was later elected as the first Prime Minister of African descent, however the Democratic Party would remain the largest party in the coalition.

== Later life ==
In July 1970, Kroon founded the party Movimento pa adelanto Social Antiyano (Movement for Antillian Social Advancement). In 1971, he was re-elected to the Estates. On 20 November 1973, he became Minister of Economic Affairs, Sports and Culture in the Evertsz cabinet, and served until 14 October 1977.

After retiring from politics, Kroon became president of the Curaçao branch of Mercantil Banco, and in December 1985, he was appointed formateur of a new government which resulted in the Don Martina government.

== Honours ==
- Netherlands Knight of the Order of the Netherlands Lion
- Netherlands Commander of the Order of Orange-Nassau
- Venezuela Order of the Liberator
- Colombia Order of San Carlos

== See also ==
- Jonckheer-Kroon cabinet
