= Prime Minister of the Netherlands Antilles =

- Flag of the Netherlands Antilles (1986–2010)

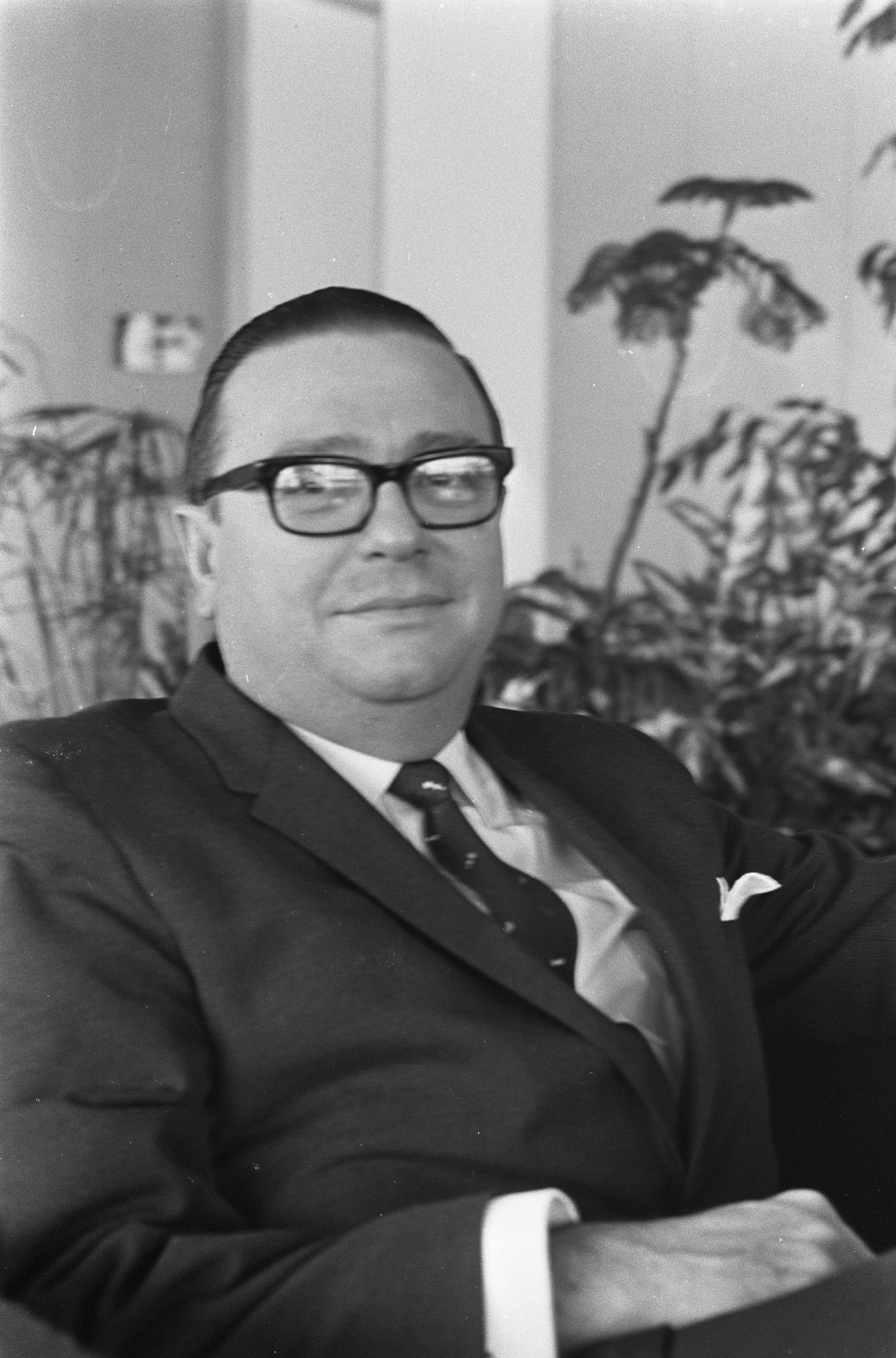
- Longest serving Efraïn Jonckheer; 15 December 1954 – 14 February 1968
- Appointer: Governor of the Netherlands Antilles
- Formation: 18 April 1951; 75 years ago
- First holder: Moises Frumencio da Costa Gomez
- Final holder: Emily de Jongh-Elhage
- Abolished: 10 October 2010; 16 years ago
- Superseded by: Prime Minister of Aruba; Prime Minister of Curaçao; Prime Minister of Sint Maarten

Below is a list of prime ministers of the Netherlands Antilles from 1951 to 2010. In 2010 the position of Prime Minister of the Netherlands Antilles was abolished, together with the dissolution of the country itself.

== List of prime ministers ==
| No. | Portrait | Name (Birth–Death) | Term of office | | | Political party | Election | Government | Monarch(s) | Ref. |
| No. | Portrait | Name (Birth–Death) | Took office | Left office | Time in office | Political party | Election | Government | Monarch(s) | Ref. |
|---|---|---|---|---|---|---|---|---|---|---|
| 1 | | Moises Frumencio da Costa Gomez (1907–1966) | 18 April 1951 | 15 December 1954 | 3 years, 241 days | PNP | 1950 | | Juliana | |
| 2 | | Efraïn Jonckheer (1917–1987) | 15 December 1954 | 14 February 1968 | 13 years, 61 days | PD | 1954 | Jonckheer I | Juliana | |
| 2 | | Efraïn Jonckheer (1917–1987) | 15 December 1954 | 14 February 1968 | 13 years, 61 days | PD | 1958 | Jonckheer II | Juliana | |
| 2 | | Efraïn Jonckheer (1917–1987) | 15 December 1954 | 14 February 1968 | 13 years, 61 days | PD | 1962 | Jonckheer III | Juliana | |
| 2 | | Efraïn Jonckheer (1917–1987) | 15 December 1954 | 14 February 1968 | 13 years, 61 days | PD | 1966 | Jonckheer IV | Juliana | |
| 3 | | Ciro Kroon (1916–2001) | 14 February 1968 | 5 June 1969 (Note: Resigned during the 1969 Curaçao uprising.) | 1 year, 111 days | PD | — | Jonckheer IV | Juliana | |
| – | | Gerald Sprockel (1919–1999) acting | 26 June 1969 | 12 December 1969 | 169 days | Independent | — | Sprockel | Juliana | |
| 4 | | Ernesto Petronia (1916–1993) | 12 December 1969 | 12 February 1971 | 1 year, 62 days | PD | 1969 | Petronia | Juliana | |
| 5 | | Ronchi Isa (1917–2005) | February 1971 | June 1971 | 109 days | PD | — | Isa-Beaujon | Juliana | |
| 6 | | Otto Beaujon (1915–1984) | 1 June 1971 | 15 November 1972 | 1 year, 167 days | PD | — | Isa-Beaujon | Juliana | |
| (5) | | Ronchi Isa (1917–2005) | November 1972 | December 1973 | 1 year, 35 days | PD | — | Isa-Beaujon | Juliana | |
| 7 | | Juancho Evertsz (1923–2008) | 20 December 1973 | 30 September 1977 | 3 years, 284 days | PNP | 1973 | Evertsz | Juliana | |
| – | | Leo Chance (born 1932) acting | 30 September 1977 | 4 October 1977 | 4 days | WIPM | — | Evertsz | Juliana | |
| – | | Lucina da Costa Gomez-Matheeuws (1929–2017) acting | 4 October 1977 | 14 October 1977 | 10 days | PNP | — | Evertsz | Juliana | |
| 8 | | Boy Rozendal (1928–2003) | 14 October 1977 | 6 July 1979 | 1 year, 265 days | PD | 1977 | Rozendal | Juliana | |
| – | | Miguel Pourier (1938–2013) acting | 6 July 1979 | December 1979 | 4 months | UPB | — | Pourier I | Juliana | |
| 10 | | Don Martina (1935–2024) | December 1979 | 18 September 1984 | 4 years, 9 months | MAN | 1979 | Martina I | Juliana | |
| 10 | | Don Martina (1935–2024) | December 1979 | 18 September 1984 | 4 years, 9 months | MAN | 1982 | Martina II | Juliana | |
| 10 | | Don Martina (1935–2024) | December 1979 | 18 September 1984 | 4 years, 9 months | MAN | — | Martina III | Juliana | |
| 11 | | Maria Liberia Peters (born 1941) | 18 September 1984 | 1 January 1986 | 1 year, 105 days | PNP | — | Liberia-Peters I | Beatrix | |
| (10) | | Don Martina (1935–2014) | 1 January 1986 | 17 May 1988 | 2 years, 137 days | MAN | 1985 | Martina IV | Beatrix | |
| (11) | | Maria Liberia Peters (born 1941) | 17 May 1988 | 25 November 1993 | 5 years, 192 days | PNP | 1988 | Liberia-Peters II | Beatrix | |
| (11) | | Maria Liberia Peters (born 1941) | 17 May 1988 | 25 November 1993 | 5 years, 192 days | PNP | 1990 | Liberia-Peters III | Beatrix | |
| – | | Suzanne Camelia-Römer (born 1959) acting | 25 November 1993 | 28 December 1993 | 33 days | PNP | — | | Beatrix | |
| – | | Alejandro Felipe Paula (1937–2018) acting | 28 December 1993 | 31 March 1994 | 93 days | PNP | — | Paula | Beatrix | |
| 12 | | Miguel Pourier (1938–2013) | 31 March 1994 | 14 May 1998 | 4 years, 44 days | PAR | 1994 | Pourier II | Beatrix | |
| 13 | | Suzanne Camelia-Römer (born 1959) | 14 May 1998 | 8 November 1999 | 1 year, 178 days | PNP | 1998 | Camelia-Römer | Beatrix | |
| (12) | | Miguel Pourier (1938–2013) | 8 November 1999 | 3 June 2002 | 2 years, 207 days | PAR | — | Pourier III | Beatrix | |
| 14 | | Etienne Ys (born 1962) | 3 June 2002 | 22 July 2003 | 1 year, 49 days | PAR | 2002 | Ys I | Beatrix | |
| – | | Ben Komproe (1942–2004) acting | 22 July 2003 | 11 August 2003 | 20 days | FOL | — | | Beatrix | |
| 15 | | Mirna Louisa-Godett (born 1954) | 11 August 2003 | 3 June 2004 | 297 days | FOL | — | Godett | Beatrix | |
| (14) | | Etienne Ys (born 1962) | 3 June 2004 | 26 March 2006 | 1 year, 296 days | PAR | — | Ys II | Beatrix | |
| 16 | | Emily de Jongh-Elhage (born 1946) | 26 March 2006 | 10 October 2010 | 4 years, 198 days | PAR | — | De Jongh-Elhage I | Beatrix | |
| 16 | | Emily de Jongh-Elhage (born 1946) | 26 March 2006 | 10 October 2010 | 4 years, 198 days | PAR | 2010 | De Jongh-Elhage II | Beatrix | |

== See also ==
- Governor of the Netherlands Antilles
- Minister Plenipotentiary of the Netherlands Antilles
- Prime Minister of the West Indies Federation (British West Indies)
