= Steven Martina =

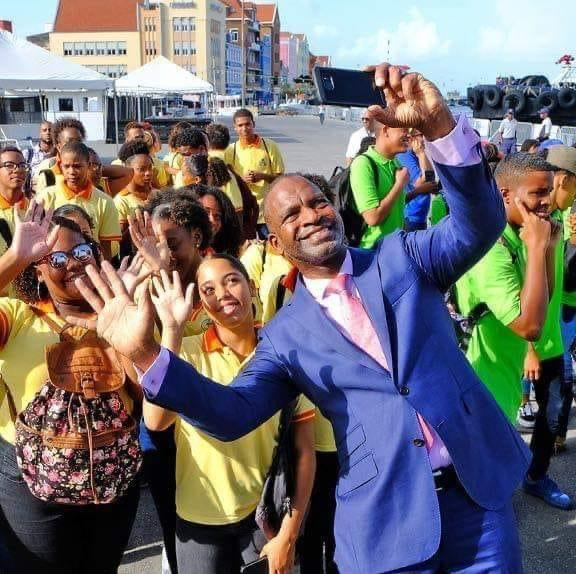

Minister of Economic Development
- Incumbent
- Assumed office 22 May 2020
- Prime Minister: Eugene Rhuggenaath
- Preceded by: Giselle McWilliam
- In office 2 June 2017 – 21 February 2019
- Prime Minister: Eugene Rhuggenaath
- Preceded by: Errol Goeloe
- Succeeded by: Kenneth Gijsbertha (interim), Giselle McWilliam

Minister of Economic Development and Vice Prime Minister
- In office 31 December 2012 – 7 June 2013
- Prime Minister: Daniel Hodge
- Preceded by: José Jardim (as Minister of Economic Development)
- Succeeded by: Stanley Palm

Personal details
- Born: 13 November 1961 (age 64)
- Party: Partido MAN
- Relations: Don Martina (father)
- Children: 2
- Education: Tilburg University; Delft University of Technology
- Occupation: Businessman, politician

Ivan Steve "Steven" Martina (born 13 November 1961) is a Curaçaoan businessman and politician of the Partido MAN. He is Minister of Economic Development in the cabinet of Eugene Rhuggenaath since 22 May 2020 and served in the same position from 2 June 2017 to 21 February 2019. He previously served as Minister of Economic Development and vice Prime Minister in the cabinet of Daniel Hodge between 31 December 2012 and 7 June 2013.

== Career ==
Martina was born on 13 November 1961. He is the son of Don Martina, a former Prime Minister of the Netherlands Antilles. Martina studied in the Netherlands, obtaining a Msc in Information Management at Tilburg University and subsequently a PhD in Applied Economics at Delft University of Technology. From 1999 to 2006 he was director at the public utility Aqualectra. Martina then became president and CEO at insurance company Fatum.

Martina served as Minister of Economic Development and vice Prime Minister in the cabinet of Daniel Hodge between 31 December 2012 and 7 June 2013. Martina was supported for the position of Minister by the Partido pa Adelanto I Inovashon Soshal. He was succeeded by Stanley Palm. Martina subsequently returned to his previous employer Fatum.

Together with his father and brother he left the Partido MAN in 2011. They returned to the party in 2016. On 16 May 2020 he took over leadership of the Partido MAN from Hensley Koeiman.

On 2 June 2017 Martina was sworn in as Minister of Economic Development in the cabinet of Eugene Rhuggenaath. He temporarily resigned his position on 21 February 2019 after the public prosecutor marked Martina as a suspect in a case regarding the Public Integrity Law. The case related to Martina's former position as CEO of an insurance company and shares in that company and the passing of a law regarding motor vehicle insurance. Martina stated that he was not guilty of any crime and resigned to give the public prosecutor room to investigate further. In May 2019 the public prosecutor dismissed the case. The political party Kòrsou di Nos Tur appealed the decision and started legal procedures to force the public prosecutor to take up the case. On 22 October 2019 a court rejected the claim of Kòrsou di Nos Tur. In November the Partido MAN nominated Martina once again for the post of Minister of Economic Development. It was determined Martina would resume his position on 11 March 2020, with this later being postponed to 22 May 2020. On this date he took over the position again from Giselle McWilliam.

Martina is married and has two children.
