= Paula cabinet =

- 18th Cabinet of the Netherlands Antilles
- Date formed: 28 December 1993
- Date dissolved: 31 March 1994

People and organisations
- Head of state: Beatrix of the Netherlands
- Head of government: Alejandro Felippe Paula

History
- Outgoing election: 1994 election
- Predecessor: Liberia-Peters II
- Successor: Pourier II

The Paula cabinet was the 18th cabinet of the Netherlands Antilles.

== Composition ==
The cabinet was composed as follows:

Main office-holders
Office	Name	Party	Since
Minister of General Affairs	Alejandro Felippe Paula		28 December 1993
Minister of Labor, Social Affairs and Public Health	George Hueck	SI	28 December 1993
Minister of Justice	Suzanne Römer	PNP	28 December 1993
Minister of Education, Culture and Development Cooperation	Rudi M. Thomas	UPB	28 December 1993
Minister of Traffic and Communications	Leo A.I. Chance	^{[Note]}	28 December 1993
Minister of Finance	Faroe Metry	PNP	28 December 1993

^{Note} Leo A.I. Chance was nominated by the three windward island parties supporting the Paula cabinet.
