= Sprockel cabinet =

Government of the Netherlands Antilles between June and December 1969

- 5th Cabinet of the Netherlands Antilles

- Date formed: 27 June 1969
- Date dissolved: 12 December 1969

People and organisations
- Head of state: Juliana of the Netherlands
- Head of government: Gerald C. Sprockel

History
- Outgoing election: 1969 election
- Predecessor: Jonckheer-Kroon
- Successor: Petronia

The Sprockel cabinet was the 5th cabinet of the Netherlands Antilles.

== Composition ==
The cabinet was composed as follows:

Main office-holders
Office	Name	Party	Since
Minister of General Affairs, Justice	Gerald C. Sprockel		27 June 1969
Minister of Social Affairs, Economic Affairs	H.S. Weber		27 June 1969
Minister of Finance and Welfare	D.E. Calvo		27 June 1969
Minister of Education, Culture and Public Health	A.J. Muyale		27 June 1969
Minister of Traffic and Communications	F. Wernet		27 June 1969
