= Groot Piscadera =

Groot Piscadera Julianadorp
- Neighbourhood
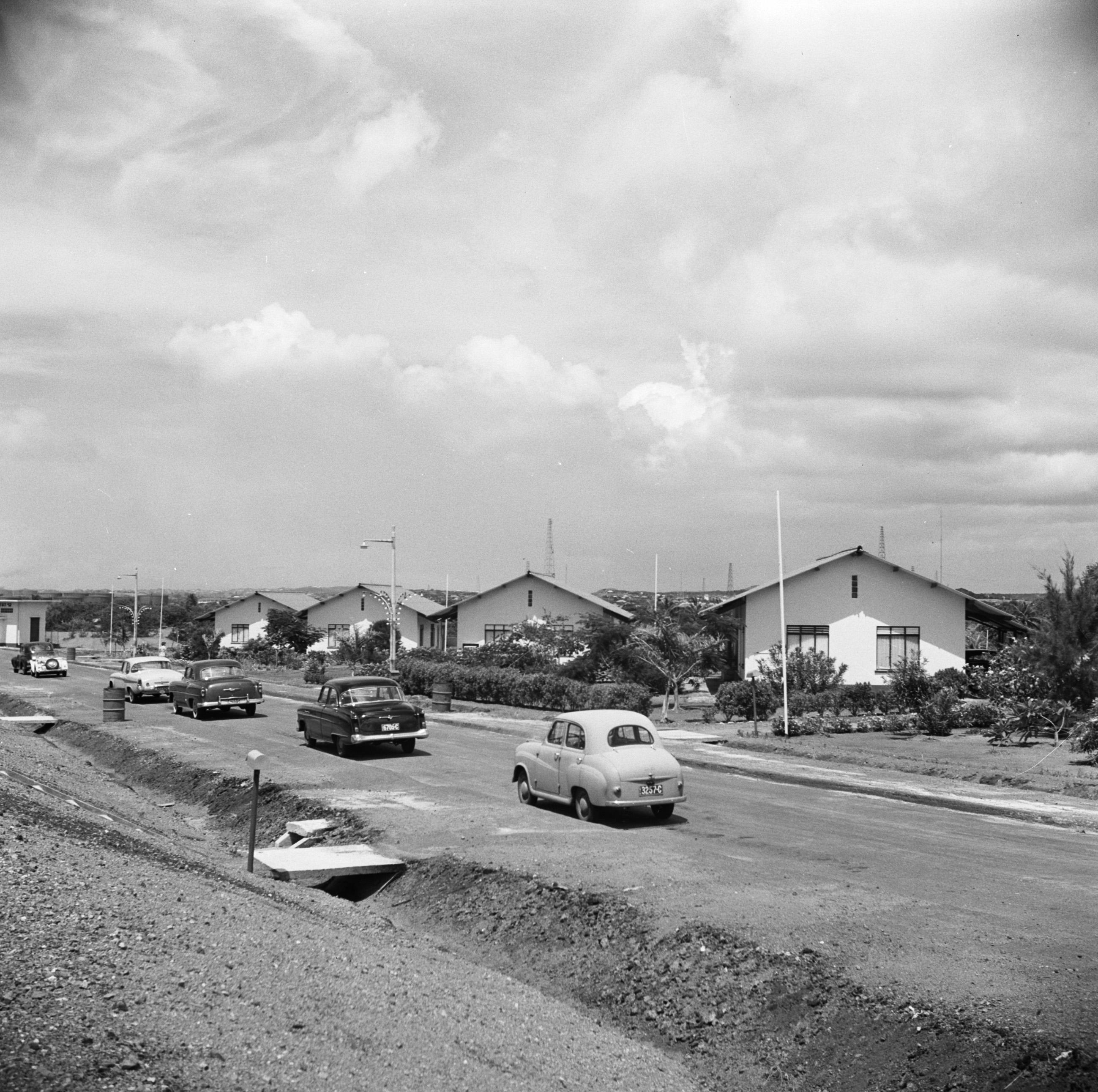
- Julianadorp (1955)

- Location in Curaçao
- Coordinates: 12.1561°N 68.9668°W
- State: Kingdom of the Netherlands
- Country: Curaçao
- City: Willemstad

Area
  - Total: 3.46 km^{2} (1.34 sq mi)

Population (2011)
  - Total: 2,822
  - Density: 816/km^{2} (2,110/sq mi)

Grőot Piscadera is a neighbourhood of Willemstad, Curaçao, a Lesser Antilles island in the Dutch Caribbean. It is better known as Julianadorp, a villa ward built by Royal Dutch Shell for its employees. Julianadorp is officially part of Groot Piscadera.

== History ==
Groot Piscadera was a plantation from the late 17th century, and was owned by Dutch West Indies Company. In 1707, the plantation was rented to planters. In 1928, Groot Piscadera and Klein Hofje were bought by Royal Dutch Shell and used as a water extraction area. The University of Curaçao was built in Groot Piscadera in the 1970s.

== Julianadorp ==
Royal Dutch Shell started to bring large numbers of workers, teachers, civil servants and businessmen to Curaçao to work at their oil refinery or provide services for the employees. In October 1929, 40 houses were constructed in Groot Piscadera. Between 1945 until 1955, Julianadorp and Emmastad were constructed as residential neighbourhoods for the employees of Royal Dutch Shell.

Julianadorp consisted of luxurious villas aligned along the trade winds for ventilation. It was a segregated and gated community where blacks and coloureds were only allowed entry with a special pass. In the 1960s, Shell started selling the houses, and by 1985, all houses had become private property. Julianadorp is no longer gated, and has been integrated in Groot Piscadera.

== Bibliography ==
- Buurtprofiel Groot Piscadera (2011). "Buurtprofiel Groot Piscadera" (PDF). Government of Curaçao (in Dutch).
