= Myra Römer =

Netherlands Antillean writer (born 1946)

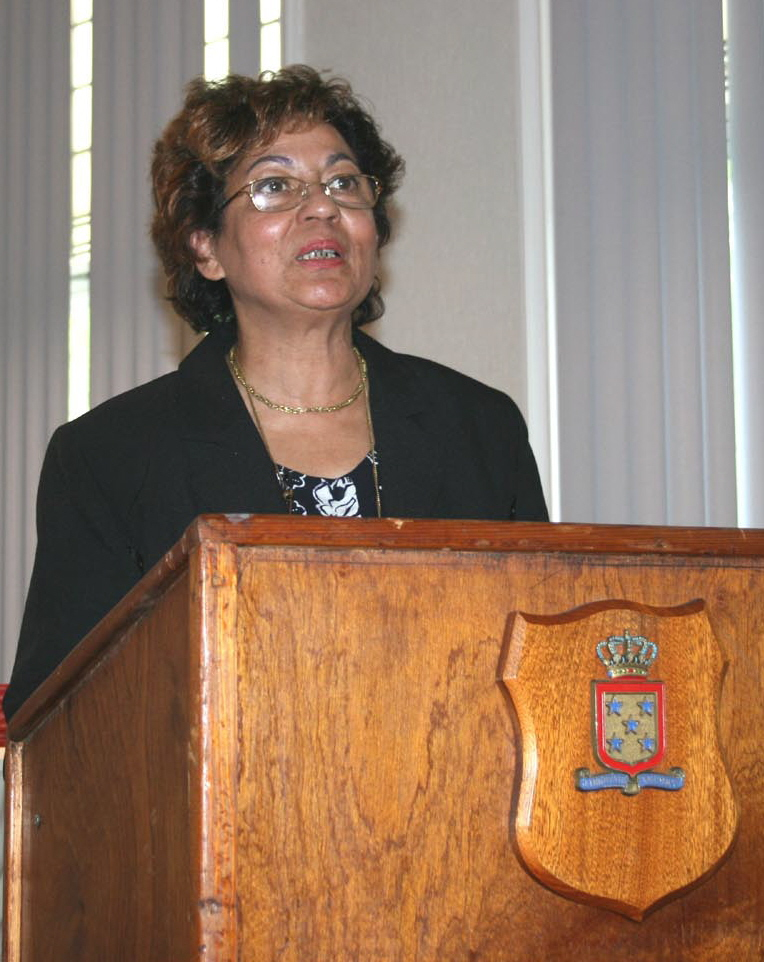
- Born: 16 September 1946 (age 79); Curaçao, Netherlands Antilles

Myra Römer is a Netherlands Antillean poet, writer, and artist from the island of Curaçao.

== Biography ==
Römer was born on Curaçao on 16 September 1946. She moved to the Netherlands for education, first studying Visual Arts in Tilburg and then Art History and Archaeology in Groningen. She worked as a teacher and school manager before she retired.

== Literature ==
In 2001, Römer's poetry appeared in two poetry collections, Na mi nombre/Bij mijn naam and Voetsporen. Almost all of these poetic works have a title which first appears in Papiamento and then in Dutch.

In 2005, Römer's first prose book Stories of Fita was published. The book follows Fita, a girl on the island of Curaçao, as she matures from a ten-year-old girl to a young woman. It is a collection of short stories which center around Fita's family and their friends, with each character taking center stage in a story and then acting as extras in others. The book incorporates themes of coexistence across religion and race, as well as highlighting everyday life on Curaçao in the mid-20th century.
