= Mamita Fox =

Dutch nurse, activist, artist and writer

- Born: Escolastica Victoria Fox; September 27, 1942 (age 83); Curaçao
- Died: Bonaire
- Occupations: Nurse, activist, writer, artist
- Years active: 1960–present
- Known for: Health care, Activism

Mamita Fox (born 1942) is a Curaçao-born nurse, activist, artist and writer who lives in Bonaire. Her autobiography, written in Papiamentu, is an important addition to works written in Creole languages. A well-known radio personality on the island, Fox became a vocal opponent to health care law changes by the Netherlands and how they impacted citizens of the former Netherlands Antilles. Her activism led to a change in the way health care was administered.

== Early life ==
Escolastica Victoria Fox was born in 1943 in Curaçao and was raised with her seven siblings by their divorced mother Lucia. She trained to be a nurse and worked in the 1960s in a hospital in the Netherlands, where she met Heinz Beck, a German musician. The two married and in 1970, had a daughter, Ernestina Amanda Victoria ‘Lucia’ Beck in Heerlen. Because Beck traveled often, the couple lived until 1975 in Germany, where Fox studied reflexology, before returning to Curaçao.

== Career ==
When the family returned to Curaçao, Fox and Beck divorced. Unable to practice reflexology because people thought she was a witch doctor, Fox opened a beauty parlor and became active in politics and women's causes. A friend of Liberia Peters, she became well known for her social activism and had both a radio program and a regular newspaper column. Because Fox was a single mother, her daughter spent a lot of time with her grandmother, who died of breast cancer in 1985. Fox pressed for and helped establish the first cancer radiation treatment center Curaçao. In 1995, when her daughter relocated to Bonaire, Fox relocated as well to care for her granddaughter, since Beck's job required that she travel.

After moving to Bonaire, Fox resumed her businesses, and activism. She began broadcasting on the radio and raising funds for the disadvantaged. Her talk-show often dealt with controversial topics, but she encouraged people to be open about taboo subjects, believing that discussion was empowering. In 1997, she wrote an autobiographical work, Identifikashon, about her struggle to discover her own identity in the patriarchal society in which she lived. Hoping to flee the class, gender, and racial discrimination, she faced in Curaçao, Fox moved to Holland, only to be disillusioned because no one there even knew geographically where Curaçao was, nor the culture of the island. Struggling with the choices of pursuing a romantic relationship or a profession, Fox chose her work. Written in Creole, Identifikashon serves as an important example, according to scholar Roberto Strongman, of writing by Caribbean women, which is distinct from the themes and styles employed by male authors writing in Creole. The text is important as it reiterates how strongly oral traditions, stylistically retold in written form, record women's experiences.

According to a law implemented in 2011, all BES islands citizens were required to be insured under the new compulsory health insurance plans of the Netherlands Health Insurance Office (Dutch: Zorgverzekeringskantoor (ZVK)). Previously because there were insufficient facilities to provide care on the islands, comprehensive health insurance allowed for treatment in places such as Colombia. The new system placed all physician referrals under the discretion of the ZVK, which routinely denied off-island referrals due to cost. It also made access to health care unequal for European Dutch citizens and Dutch citizens living in the Caribbean Netherlands. In 2013 after she was denied a medical referral, Fox staged a sit-in in front of the Caribbean Netherlands Tax Office in Kralendijk to protest the changes in health care provisions implemented by Dutch authorities. For eight days, she and her supporters protested and collected signatures.

After meeting with the Dutch ministry representative, Wilbert Stolte, Fox gained a group of written concessions allowing patients and their doctors to decide what was needed for their care. ZVK no longer had authority to deny referrals, but paid the compensation according to their guidelines. They also established a procedure for complaints and appeals of ZVK decisions.

Since 2008, Fox has been producing glass art, each piece of which contains a 5 cent Dutch coin. Fox participates regularly with other artists showing her mosaic and glass bead work, which has been featured in art galleries and promoted by the Bonaire Tourist Board, as well as exhibited in their offices. Her artwork is a continuation of her activism, as Fox has donated pieces to raise funds for various charitable causes.
