= Mirna Louisa-Godett =

Curaçaoan politician

25th Prime Minister of the Netherlands Antilles
- In office 11 August 2003 – 3 June 2004
- Monarch: Beatrix
- Preceded by: Ben Komproe
- Succeeded by: Etienne Ys

Personal details
- Born: 1 November 1951 (age 74) Curaçao

Mirna Louisa-Godett (born 29 January 1954) is a Curaçaoan politician who served as the 25th Prime Minister of the Netherlands Antilles from 11 August 2003 until 3 June 2004.

Louisa-Godett became prime minister, following fraud allegations against her brother Anthony Godett, leader of the Party Workers' Liberation Front 30 May (FOL). Their father was Wilson Godett, also known as Papa Godett, leader of the 1969 Curaçao uprising. Critics accused Louisa-Godett of being merely a puppet of her brother.

The Godett government collapsed in early 2004 over corruption allegations against justice minister Ben Komproe.

Political offices
Preceded by Ben Komproe	Prime Minister of the Netherlands Antilles; 2003–2004	Succeeded by Etienne Ys
