= Ruënna Mercelina =

Dutch Caribbean model and actress (born 1992)

- Born: Ruënna Altagracia Ines Mercelina; January 18, 1992 (age 34); Willemstad, Curaçao
- Occupations: Actress; Model; Beauty Queen
- Title: Miss Teenager Curaçao 2008; Curaçao Tourism Queen 2013

Ruënna "Sugar" Mercelina (born January 18, 1992) is a Dutch Caribbean model, beauty pageant titleholder and actress, best known for her work in stage performance and her roles in national cultural events. She is best known for playing the lead role in the 2012 play TISHA, in which she portrayed the character Tisha.

== Early life ==
Ruënna was born in St. Elizabeth Hospital to Ruthsella Mercelina-Troncon and Gwendell Mercelina Sr.

== Career ==
In 2012, Ruënna was the host of the inaugural International Film Festival Rotterdam in Curaçao, an annual local film showcase in Willemstad.

Furthermore she portrayed the title character in the play TISHA, which focuses on a fifteen-year-old girl facing an unplanned pregnancy. The play, aimed at teens in the Dutch Caribbean and the Dutch Kingdom, addresses issues such as tradition, sexual morality, and personal choice. It was performed at the youth theatre "La Tentashon" from March to November 2012 in Willemstad.
