= Diederick Charles Mathew =

St. Maartener politician

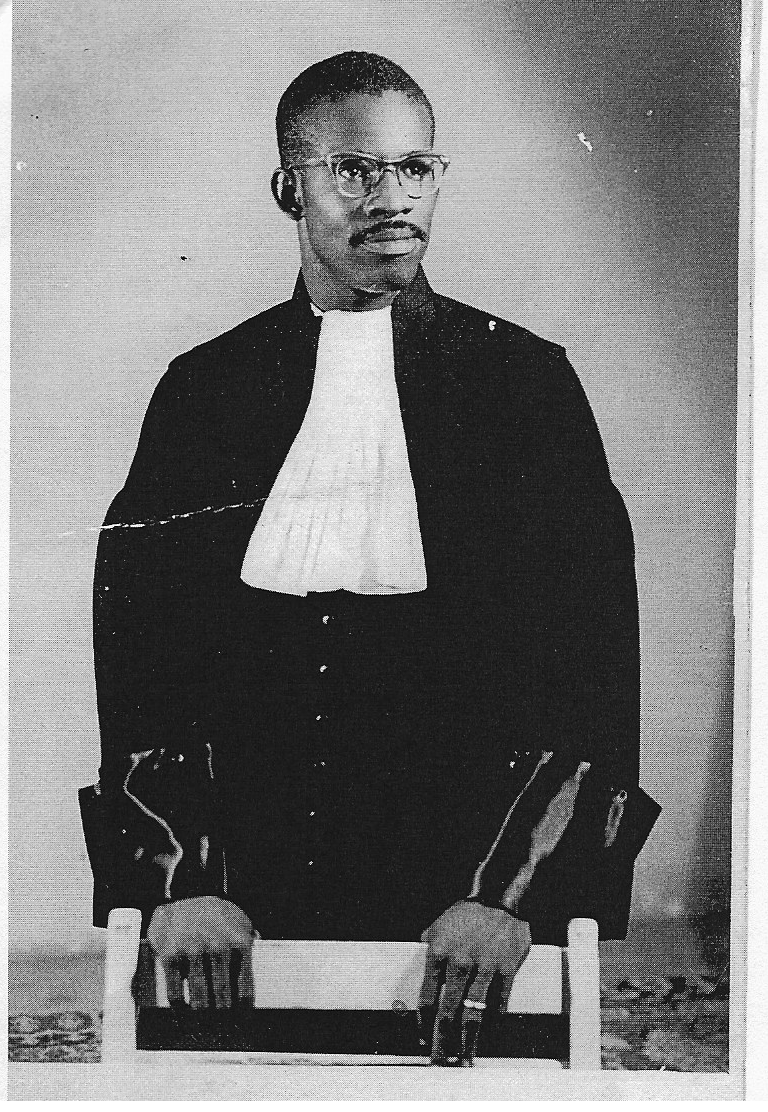
- Mathew c. 1953
- Born: February 26, 1928; St. Maarten
- Died: February 17, 1987 (aged 58); Aruba
- Occupations: Politician, teacher
- Honours: 1977 Medal – Ridder in de Orde van Oranje-Nassau (Aruba)

Diederick Charles (DC) Mathew (February 26, 1928 – February 17, 1987) was an Aruban politician and teacher. He was a deputy commissioner for Aruba in 1964 and held this position for three years. He was also a member of Aruba's Island council (Eilandsraad) in 1962–1963 as well as a member of the “Staten” (Netherlands Antilles House of Representatives).

== Early life ==
Diederick Charles Mathew was born February 26, 1928, to Abraham Mathew and Mary Eliza Arrindell on the island of St. Maarten. In 1948 he moved to Aruba and completed his teacher's training. He taught at elementary schools in San Nicolaas until 1958.

== Career ==
Diederick C. Mathew started his career in politics in 1951. For several years he worked tirelessly behind the scenes serving the community. He was also studying to become a lawyer, but decided to go full-time into politics. In 1954, was the first time he was listed as a candidate on the Partido Patriotico Arubano (P.P.A.) list to be elected member of the “Staten”. The following year in 1955 he also ran to be elected as a member of the Island's council (Eilandsraad). He was elected into this position 1955. DC Mathew has held several positions in his political career.

D.C. Mathew retired after 35 years in Education and Civil Service on September 2, 1985.

DC Mathew as island representative
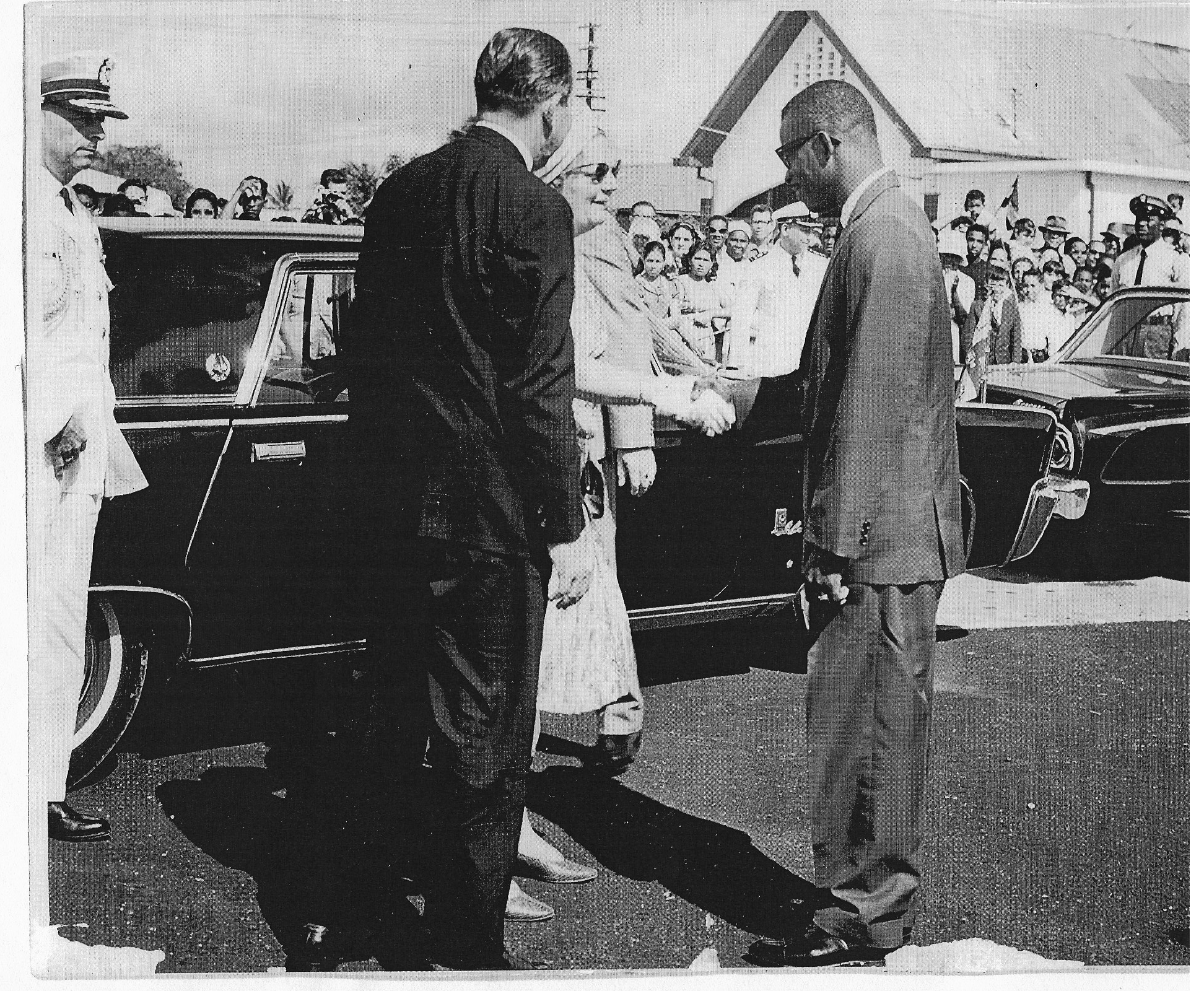
DC Mathew receives Dutch Queen Juliana October 1955

== Personal life ==
Diederick Charles Mathew was married twice. His first marriage was to Elise Ida Legrand and they had one son; Franklin. Elise died October 28, 1964 at age 30. His second marriage was to Ann Roumou, a school teacher and they had two children; Leroy and Marlene. They were married until his death in 1987.

== Honours ==
On March 25, 1977, Diederick Charles Mathew received a civilian award medal for “Ridder in de Orde van Oranje-Nassau” or Order of Orange-Nassau. This is a Dutch medal awarded to military members or civilians for their distinct contributions to society. DC Mathew received this honor in his capacity as civil servant, member of the island council, and representative.
