= Alette Beaujon =

Curaçaoan/Aruban psychologist and poet

- Born: Aletta Clémence Beaujon; 1 May 1933; Willemstad, Colony of Curaçao and Dependencies, Kingdom of the Netherlands
- Died: 3 July 2001 (aged 68); Oranjestad, Aruba, Kingdom of the Netherlands
- Other names: Aletta van Leeuwen
- Occupations: psychologist, poet
- Years active: 1957–1999

Alette Beaujon (Aletta Clémence Beaujon, Curaçao, 1 May 1933 – Aruba, 3 July 2001) was a Dutch poet and psychologist from the Netherlands Antilles. Born in Curaçao and later living in the Netherlands and Aruba, she published poems in Dutch, English and Papiamento, while working as a clinical psychologist. A collection of her unpublished poems were discovered after her death and released in 2009.

== Early life ==
Aletta Clémence Beaujon was born on 1 May 1933 in Willemstad, in the Dutch Colony of Curaçao and Dependencies to Jeanette Catherine (née Debrot) and Jan Hendrik Rudolf Beaujon. Her father worked with the Royal Dutch Steamboat Company (KNSM) as a merchant. Her family were upper class Protestants, and Beaujon grew up in Willemstad, spending summers at her uncle, Cola Debrot's plantation, "Slagbaai". Beaujon attended the Meer Uitgebreid Lager Onderwijs and won the school's Neerlandia Prize (Dutch: Neerlandia-prijs). Continuing her education, she moved to the United States and attended high school in Philadelphia. In 1950, Beaujon enrolled in Northwestern University in Evanston, Illinois, to study criminal and child psychology. She graduated in 1955 and returned to Curaçao.

== Career ==
In 1957, Beaujon published her first poems in Antilliaanse Cahiers, a literary journal. The collection of seventy-eight poems, Gedichten aan de Baai en elders (Poems on the Bay and Beyond) featured works in Dutch, English, and Papiamento with the focal point being the sea and the influences of Papiamento. That same year, she married a Royal Dutch Shell employee from the Netherlands, Eduard Cornelis Johannes van Leeuwen, who was working in Willemstad. Soon after the marriage, he was transferred to Valencia, Venezuela and the couple moved to South America. In 1958, Beaujon gave birth to her first son, Jeannouel and the following year, she published a second collection of poems Poems while in Delos in Antilliaanse Cahiers. In 1961, the couple had their second son, Juan Carlos, but within five years, they would divorce and Beaujon returned to Curaçao with her sons.

From 1966 to 1969, Beaujon worked as a clinical psychologist and the family lived in the Mahaai-Van Engelen neighborhood of Willemstad and published poems in Amigoe, a newspaper published in the Netherlands Antilles. In 1969, she moved to Baarn in the Netherlands and enrolled in the University of Utrecht. Subsequently, they moved to Noordwijk aan Zee and Oegstgeest, while her sons studied and she completed her degree. Finishing her studies in 1973, Beaujon began working as a psychologist in Leiden, where her children attended university. Each summer during her stay in the Netherlands, Beaujon returned to Curaçao, to ensure that her children did not lose their proficiency with Papiamento. Her work was included in the Bibliography of Pidgen and Creole Languages published in 1976, as one of the authors who promoted using their native creole tongues in their works.

In 1980, Beaujon returned to the Caribbean, settling in Aruba. She worked with mentally disabled children in Oranjestad until 1999, when she became ill with cancer.

== Death and legacy ==
Beaujon died on 3 July 2001 at the Horatio Oduber Hospital in Oranjestad and was buried at St Ann's Church. In 2008, Klaas de Groot found unpublished poems written by Beaujon in the papers of her uncle, Cola Debrot, which had been deposited in the archives of the Public Library of The Hague. The collection of sixty-four poems, Weggespoelde woorden zijn (Words washed away) and fourteen poems previously published in 1959, were compiled by de Groot and published in 2009 as De schoonheid van blauw (The beauty of blue). Beaujon's poetry expresses pictures providing a sensory feel of freedom and depict the landscapes of the Antilles, Greece, and the Netherlands, in beautiful language, with an underlying layer of philosophical query.

== Publications ==
Her publications under her author's name Alette Beaujon include:

- Gedichten aan de Baai en elders, Amsterdam : Bezige Bij, 1957. Series: Antilliaanse cahiers, jrg. 2, nr. 3–4.
- with Aart G. Broek: De schoonheid van blauw = The beauty of blue : verzamelde gedichten, Haarlem : In de Knipscheer, 2009.
- with Frank Martinus Arion: Statuutdag 1956, (Amsterdam) : Oost en West (etc.), (1956).
- with Frank Martinus Arion, Alex J G Reinders et al.: De eenheid van het kristal : Cola Debrot Symposium 1986, Curaçao : Kolibri, 1988.
- Aletta C. Beaujon, s.l., s.n., 1957.
