= Etienne Ys =

Curaçaoan politician

23rd & 26th Prime Minister of the Netherlands Antilles
- In office 4 June 2004 – 26 March 2006
- Monarch: Beatrix
- Preceded by: Mirna Louisa-Godett
- Succeeded by: Emily de Jongh-Elhage

Minister of Finance
- In office 1994–1995
- Preceded by: Faroe Metry
- Succeeded by: Harold Henriquez

Personal details
- Born: 26 February 1962 (age 64) Curaçao

Etienne Nestor Ys (born 26 February 1962) is a Curaçaoan politician who served as the 23rd and 26th Prime Minister of the Netherlands Antilles from 2002–2003 and again from 2004–2006. He previously served as Minister of Finance from 1994–1995.

Ys was born in Curaçao on 26 February 1962. Ys studied law at the Groningen University and graduated in 1985. Following his graduation he worked as a tax inspector at the Dutch Revenue Services "belastingdienst". He went on to serve as Minister of Finance of the Netherlands Antilles from 1994–1995, and then commissioner of the island territory of Curaçao.

Following the 2017 Curaçao general election he was appointed as informateur. After the formation of the new government, he was appointed as chairman of the board of the Central Bank of Curaçao and Sint Maarten.

Political offices
Preceded by Miguel Pourier	Prime Minister of the Netherlands Antilles; 2002–2003	Succeeded by Ben Komproe
Preceded by Mirna Louisa-Godett	Prime Minister of the Netherlands Antilles; 2004—2006	Succeeded by Emily de Jongh-Elhage
