= Ben Komproe =

Curaçaoan politician

24th Prime Minister of the Netherlands Antilles
- In office 22 July 2003 – 11 August 2003
- Monarch: Beatrix
- Preceded by: Etienne Ys
- Succeeded by: Mirna Louisa-Godett

Personal details
- Born: 22 October 1942
- Died: 11 October 2004 (aged 62)

Benard Komproe (22 October 1942 – 11 October 2004) was a Curaçaoan politician who briefly served as the 24th prime minister of the Netherlands Antilles from 22 July 2003 to 11 August 2003.

Komproe was a member of the local party Frente Obrero Liberashon 30 di Mei (FOL), and was fifth on the ballot for the 2003 Curaçao general election. When party leader Anthony Godett was blocked from being appointed formateur pending a police investigation, Komproe was appointed instead. Komproe was named Prime Minister of the Netherlands Antilles from 22 July until 11 August 2003. After that, he was replaced by Mirna Louisa-Godett, and became Minister of Justice.

As Minister of Justice, Komproe attempted to order the local authorities to cease investigations into his brother Hedwig Komproe. Additionally, he tried to have the Attorney General fired. when it became known that he violated his oath of office, the Parliament of the Netherlands Antilles forced Komproe to resign, leading to the fall of the Godett Cabinet.

After his resignation, a judicial investigation was started on Komproe's tenure as minister. The investigation included what went on at an open-air brothel Campo Alegre. Komproe was alleged to have given out signed letters, basically to allow dozens of prostitutes from Colombia and the Dominican Republic to reside on Curaçao. He was said to have plans to process each prostitute's permit of residence personally, and to have ordered a special stamp just for this purpose. In July 2004, a judge determined that Komproe was not authorized to issue letters of that nature. Additionally, Komproe did favors for Giovanni van Ierland, the incarcerated owner of the brothel.

In September 2004, Komproe was to be on the Curaçao Island Council for the FOL. However, he was arrested on 6 September 2004, and charged with corruption, fraud, and being member of a criminal organisation. On 24 September his imprisonment was delayed, followings complications from an abdominal operation he underwent a few days earlier. He never regained consciousness and died at the age of 62.

Political offices
Preceded by Etienne Ys	Prime Minister of the Netherlands Antilles; 2003	Succeeded by Mirna Louisa-Godett
