= Emily de Jongh-Elhage =

Curaçaoan politician

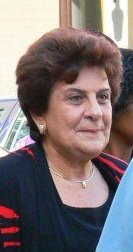
- De Jongh-Elhage in 2007

Prime Minister of the Netherlands Antilles
- In office 26 March 2006 – 10 October 2010
- Monarch: Beatrix
- Preceded by: Etienne Ys
- Succeeded by: Office abolished

Personal details
- Born: 7 December 1946 (age 79) Netherlands Antilles
- Party: Party for the Restructured Antilles

Emily Saïdy de Jongh-Elhage (born 7 December 1946) is a Curaçaoan former politician who served as the 27th and final prime minister of the Netherlands Antilles from 2006 until its dissolution in 2010. Following the 2010 Curaçao general election she was elected to parliament and served until her retirement in 2012.

== Personal background ==
De Jongh-Elhage (née Saïdy) is Dutch of Lebanese descent and a member of the Council of Women World Leaders, an international network of current and former women presidents and prime ministers whose mission is to mobilize the highest-level women leaders globally for collective action on issues of critical importance to women and equitable development.

Political offices
Preceded by Etienne Ys	Prime Minister of the Netherlands Antilles; 2006 — 2010	Succeeded by office abolished
