= Don Martina =

Curaçaoan politician (1935–2024)

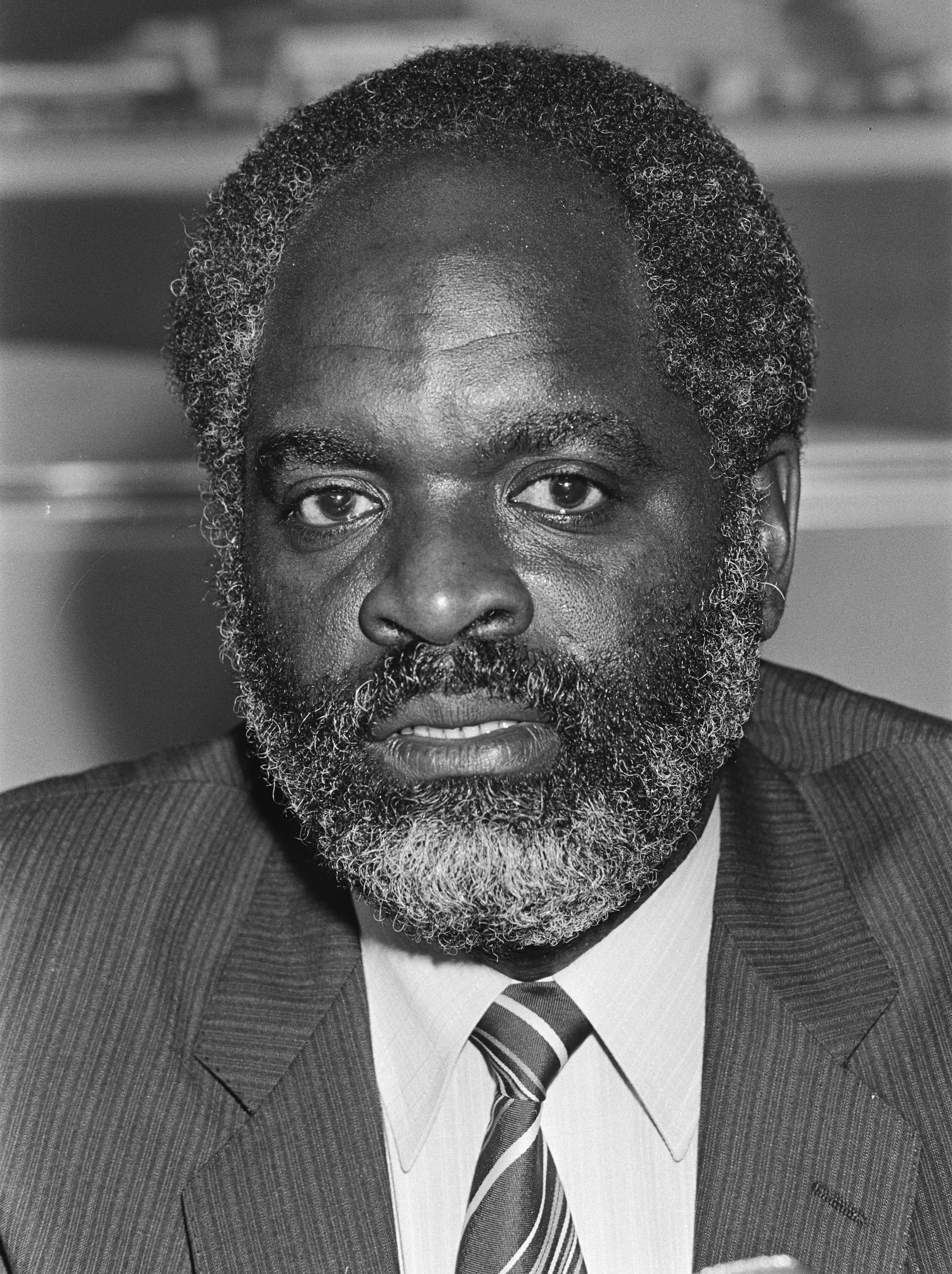
- Martina in 1981

Prime Minister of the Netherlands Antilles
- In office November 1979 – October 1984
- Monarchs: Juliana (until 1980); Beatrix
- Governor: Bernadito M. Leito (until 1983); René Römer
- Preceded by: Miguel Pourier
- Succeeded by: Maria Liberia Peters
- In office January 1986 – July 1988
- Monarch: Beatrix
- Governor: René Römer
- Preceded by: Maria Liberia Peters
- Succeeded by: Maria Liberia Peters

Personal details
- Born: Dominico Felipe Martina; 1 May 1935 Curaçao
- Died: 21 December 2024 (aged 89) Willemstad, Curaçao
- Party: Partido MAN
- Children: 3 (including Steven)

Dominico Felipe "Don" Martina (1 May 1935 – 21 December 2024) was a Curaçaoan politician. He served two terms as prime minister of the Netherlands Antilles. His first term lasted from November 1979 to October 1984 and his second term from January 1986 to July 1988.

One of the founders of the Partido MAN, Martina led his party in multiple cabinets. During his first term as prime minister he dealt with discussions regarding Aruba's wish to leave the Netherlands Antilles. At the start of his second term Aruba left, which, together with other circumstances, forced Martina to take austerity measures.

== Early life and career ==
Martina was born on Curaçao on 1 May 1935. From 1952 to 1956 Martina attended the Hogere technische school in Haarlem, the Netherlands. During this period the Charter for the Kingdom of the Netherlands was signed, of which Martina later reflected that it laid the foundations for his political activities. He subsequently attended the University of the West Indies where he obtained his BsC in mechanical engineering in 1967 and Columbia University where he obtained his MsC in management and industrial engineering in 1968. Martina was trained as a civil engineer. While at Columbia, Martina was inspired by the fight of Martin Luther King Jr. for civil rights.

After the 1969 Curaçao uprising the Movementu Antia Nobo (the later Partido MAN) was founded on 6 February 1971 by a group of young men including Martina. The group opposed the nepotism and corruption on the island, which they saw as persisting after the 1969 events. At the 1971 elections Martina was elected to the Curaçao island council. From 1972 to 1976 he was justice commissioner.

== First term as prime minister ==
At the 1979 general Netherlands Antilles elections Martina's Partido MAN became the largest party. He personally obtained 25,849 votes, a record which had not been surpassed as of 2024. Martina subsequently became prime minister. He formed a coalition with the Aruban Movimiento Electoral di Pueblo (MEP), Bonaire Patriotic Union. In December 1979 or 1980 the Democratic Party of Curaçao also joined.

In 1981 talks started on the political future of Aruba. In a round table conference consisting of 65 delegates, the Netherlands Antilles, its six islands, and the Netherlands held discussions. Martina and Dutch Minister Fons van der Stee alternated the chairmanship of the meetings. With negotiations between the Netherlands Antilles, the Netherlands and Aruba not going well the Aruban MEP left the coalition, after MEP-ministers declared possible oil revenues near the islands solely for Aruba. Martina kept the parliamentary majority as the Democratic Party Sint Maarten joined his coalition. In 1982 a member of the Democratic Party of Sint Maarten withdrew support for the government. In June 1982 new general elections were held to solve the impasse. It took until October for Martina to form a new government.

In June 1983 a solution was found to Aruba's wishes for independence, Aruba would obtain a status aparte per 1986, becoming a constituent country within the Kingdom of the Netherlands. It would be allowed to become independent in 1996. The coalition broke in June 1984 when several MAN deputies, including Speaker of the Estates, Roy Markes, left the party and withdrew support of the coalition. This led to Maria Liberia Peters of the National People's Party taking over as prime minister.

== Second term as prime minister ==
For the subsequent 1985 general Netherlands Antilles elections the Partido MAN under Martina campaigned against the crisis tax of 10% on income which had been installed by Liberia Peters. It furthermore opposed several measures regarding the split of Aruba and the Netherlands Antilles, such as a cooperation agreement and the dividing norm of gold and currency. The Partido MAN was less successful than at the 1979 elections. Nonetheless Martina managed to become prime minister again after Liberia Peters failed to form a government.

In 1986 and 1987 the economic situation of the Netherlands Antilles worsened with the departure of Aruba and diminished revenue from the petroleum and financial services industries. Martina's government subsequently implemented austerity measures. In 1986, Claude Wathey of Sint Maarten desired a status aparte similar to Aruba or independence for his island. In 1989 Martina declared his support for a reform of the Netherlands Antilles, with less strong ties between the remaining five islands.

This time his government fell in March 1988, after losing support of the Democratic Party of Sint Maarten and the Party Workers' Liberation Front 30 May (FOL). Martina was once again succeeded by Liberia Peters.

== Later career ==
During his political career Martina also served several years in the Estates of the Netherlands Antilles. After serving as prime minister he continued as party leader of the Partido MAN. At the 1994 general Netherlands Antilles elections his party obtained 2 of the 22 seats and subsequently participated in the government of Prime Minister Miguel Pourier.

Since the 1995 Curaçao island council elections, Martina's Partido MAN was member of the government coalition together with the Party for the Restructured Antilles (PAR). During 1997 and 1998 the Partido MAN lost public support. In the 1999 Curaçao island council elections Martina's Partido MAN lost four of its six seats. Martina subsequently announced his retirement from active politics.

In 2011 Martina, together with his sons, left the Partido MAN. Martina had been unhappy with the course the party was following. He also criticized the collaboration with the Movement for the Future of Curaçao and Sovereign People. In August 2016, after Hensley Koeiman took control of the party, Martina and his sons returned to the party.

As chairperson of the Fundashon Rehabilitashon Tula Martina campaigned for the rehabilitation and declaration as national hero of Tula, a slave that led the Curaçao Slave Revolt of 1795 and was subsequently executed. In 2013 Tula was declared a national hero. Martina has also spoken out for improved water resource management on Curaçao. Through his foundation Nos Kunuku he promoted subsistince agriculture.

== Honours and awards ==
Martina received the Order of Francisco de Miranda of Venezuela in the first class in 1983. During the same year he also received the Order of the Liberator in first class from Venezuela. In 1983, Martina was also named a Knight in the Order of the Netherlands Lion. In 1995 he was named Grand Officer in the Order of Orange-Nassau.

In 2015 the Emancipatie en Rijkseenheid Boulevard was renamed in his honor, to the Dominico F. 'Don' Martina Boulevard. The decision was made public on Martina's 80th birthday. In 2020 he received an honorary doctorate by his alma mater, the University of the West Indies. In 2023 Martina was named Minister of State of Curaçao as recognition for his contributions to the Curaçaoan community.

== Personal life and death ==
Martina had one daughter and two sons. His son Steven Martina served as Minister of Economic Development of Curaçao.

In 2010 a book about Martina was published: Don Martina: waardig en rechtvaardig.

Martina died in Willemstad, Curaçao, on 21 December 2024, at the age of 89.

Political offices
Preceded by Miguel A. Pourier	Prime Minister of the Netherlands Antilles; 1979–1984	Succeeded by Maria Liberia Peters
Preceded by Maria Liberia Peters	Prime Minister of the Netherlands Antilles; 1986–1988	Succeeded by Maria Liberia Peters
