= Ronchi Isa =

Politician of the Netherlands Antilles

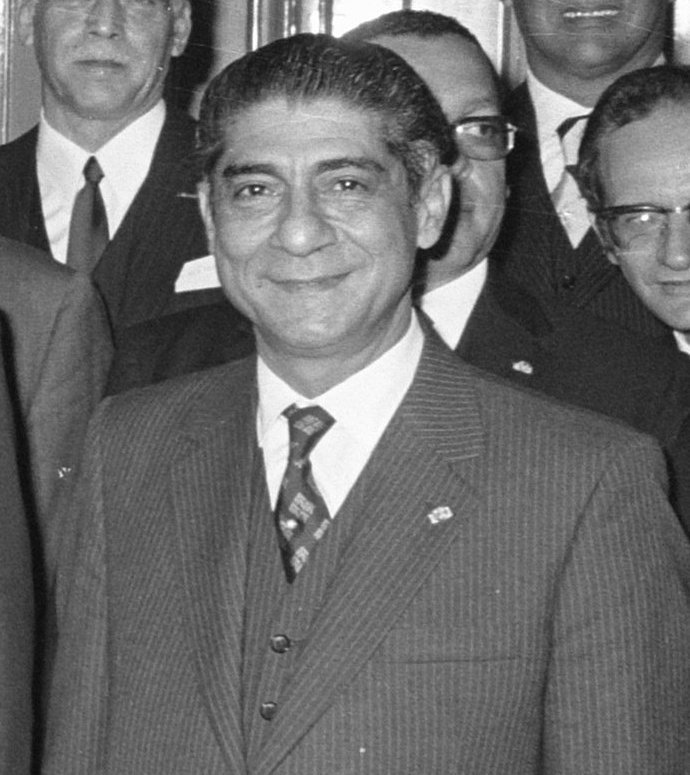
- R.J. Isa (1972)

Prime Minister of the Netherlands Antilles
- In office February 1971 – April 1971
- Monarch: Queen Juliana
- Preceded by: Ernesto Petronia
- Succeeded by: Otto Beaujon
- In office November 1972 – December 1973
- Preceded by: Otto Beaujon
- Succeeded by: Juancho Evertsz

Personal details
- Born: Ramez Jorge Isa; 17 October 1917 Curaçao, Curaçao and Dependencies
- Died: 17 March 2005 (aged 87) Curaçao, Netherlands Antilles
- Party: Democratic Party
- Occupation: politician

Ramez Jorge (Ronchi) Isa (17 October 1917 – 17 March 2005) was a politician of the Netherlands Antilles of Lebanese descent. Isa served as Prime Minister of the Netherlands Antilles from February 1971 until April 1971, and from November 1972 until December 1973.

== Biography ==
Isa was born in Curaçao on 17 October 1917. Isa was one of the founders of the Democratic Party (DP) with Efrain Jonckheer. He passed the exam for 'praktizijn' (lawyer) in 1944 and practised in Curaçao. In 1949 he succeeded C.D. Kroon as a member of the Estates (parliament) of which he became the speaker in 1956. In 1959 he succeeded J.A.O. Bikker as Minister of Justice.

Isa served as Minister of Justice during the violent uprising in Curaçao on 30 May 1969. Governor N.C. Debrot was abroad, therefore Isa formally requested the Dutch government for military assistance, because the police were no longer able to handle the situation. After marines were deployed, the uprising, which killed two people and injured dozens, subsided.

From February 1971 until April 1971, Isa served as prime minister of the Netherlands Antilles. His resignation was the result of a painful defeat in the elections. After his successor O.R.A. Beaujon had resigned in November 1972, Isa again became Prime Minister of the Netherlands Antilles. At the end of 1973, after a conflict with S.G.M. Rozendal, he left the DP and resigned his position as Prime Minister.

Isa died on 17 March 2005 from cancer, at the age of 87.

== Bibliography ==
- Emsley D. Tromp, Ivan de Windt, et al., Ronchi Isa: grootheid in eenvoud : de immigrantenzoon als patriarch, politicus en premier. (2001) Amsterdam: SWP. ISBN 9789066654471 (in Dutch, English, and Papiamento)
