= Juancho Evertsz =

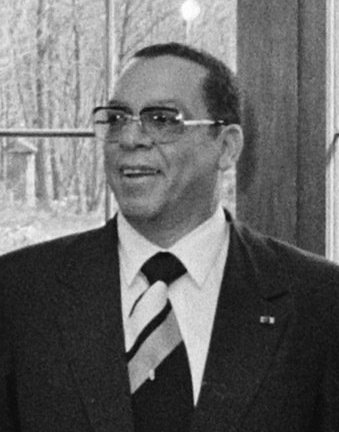

6th Prime Minister of the Netherlands Antilles
- In office 1973–1977
- Preceded by: Ronchi Isa
- Succeeded by: Leo Chance

Personal details
- Born: 8 March 1923 Curaçao, Netherlands Antilles
- Died: 30 April 2008 (aged 85) Curaçao, Netherlands Antilles
- Party: Antilles National People's Party (NVP)
- Spouse: Idith A. Evertsz-de Lanoy

Juancho Evertsz (8 March 1923 – 30 April 2008), whose full name was Juan Miguel Gregorio Evertsz, was a Dutch Antillean politician who served as the Prime Minister of the Netherlands Antilles between 1973 and 1977.

Evertsz was one of the founding members and leaders of the Antilles National People's Party, which is also known by the abbreviation, NVP. He openly opposed a plan to separate Aruba from the Netherlands Antilles as a separate, autonomous entity within the Kingdom of the Netherlands during his tenure as prime minister. Evertsz argued that the removal of Aruba from the Netherlands Antilles would undermine the federation of Dutch islands in the Caribbean. Aruba later seceded from the Netherlands Antilles in 1986, but remained within the Kingdom of the Netherlands.

Evertsz also openly clashed with Dutch Prime Minister Joop den Uyl and the Dutch Labour Party when the Uyl proposed full independence for the Netherlands Antilles. Evertsz vehemently opposed the proposal.

Evertsz died on Curaçao on 30 April 2008, at the age of 85.

== See also ==
- List of prime ministers of the Netherlands Antilles

Political offices
Preceded by Ronchi Isa	Prime Ministers of the Netherlands Antilles; 1973–1977	Succeeded by Leo Chance
