= Boy Rozendal =

Curaçao politician and journalist

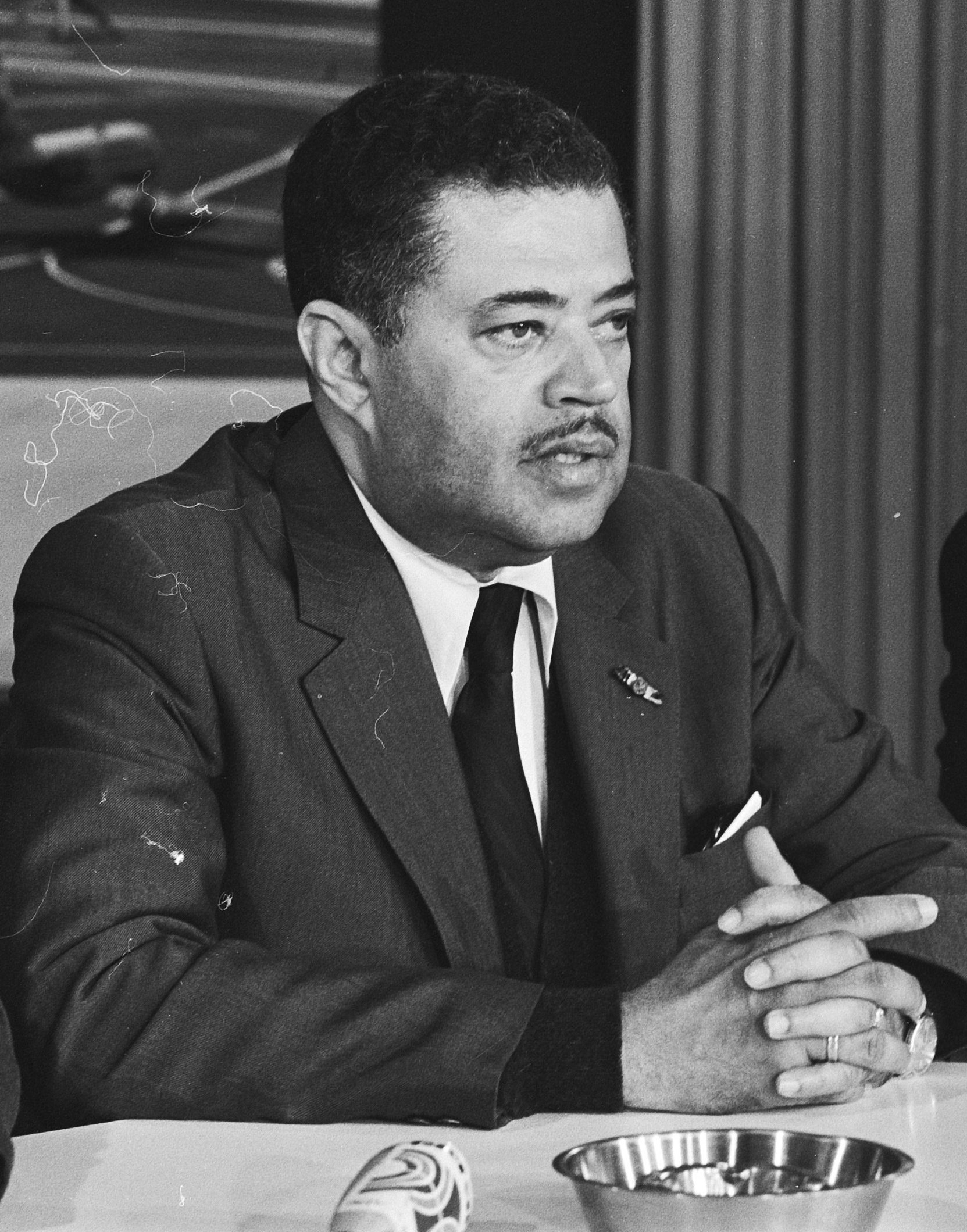
- Rozendal (1978)

Prime Minister of the Netherlands Antilles
- In office 14 October 1977 – 6 July 1979
- Monarch: Queen Juliana
- Preceded by: Lucina da Costa Gomez-Matheeuws a.i.
- Succeeded by: Miguel Pourier a.i.

Minister Plenipotentiary
- In office 12 February 1971 – 1 December 1975

Minister of Finance and Deputy Prime Minister
- In office 12 December 1969 – 12 February 1971

Personal details
- Born: Sylvius Gerard Marie Rozendal; 4 July 1928 Curaçao
- Died: 10 June 2003 (aged 74) Willemstad, Curaçao
- Party: Democratic Party of Curaçao
- Occupation: politician and journalist

Sylvius Gerard Marie "Boy" Rozendal (4 July 1928 – 10 June 2003) was an Curaçao politician and journalist. He served as Prime Minister of the Netherlands Antilles from 1971 until 1975, Minister of Finance and Deputy Prime Minister from 1969 until 1971, and Minister Plenipotentiary of the Netherlands Antilles from 1971 until 1975.

== Biography ==
Rozendal was born on 4 July 1928 in Curaçao. After graduating high school, he went to the Netherlands to study at the University of Amsterdam, and in 1957, obtained his doctorate in political and social sciences at the Graduate Institute of International and Development Studies in Genève, Switzerland.

Rozendal returned to Curaçao and in 1958 joined the Democratic Party. In 1959, he was first elected to the island council of Curaçao. In 1966, he was first elected to the Estates of the Netherlands Antilles.

The 1969 Curaçao uprising resulted in a collapse of the government. On 12 December 1969, Rozendal was appointed Minister of Finance and Deputy Prime Minister. On 12 February 1971, he was appointed Minister Plenipotentiary. and served until 1 December 1975. In 1973, he became chairperson of the Democratic Party.

A major issue for the 1977 elections was the status aparte for Aruba which would make the island a constituent country within the Kingdom of the Netherlands, and no longer subordinate to Curaçao. The Democratic Party was opposed to a special status, and won a clear victory in the elections. On 14 October 1977, Rozendal became Prime Minister of the Netherlands Antilles. His tenure was marred by demonstrations and riots in Aruba organised by Betico Croes. Rozendal turned in his resignation effective 6 July 1979. On 1 January 1986, Aruba became a constituent country.

Rozendal retired from politics and became an editor and a journalist. He would return to the Estates between 1990 and 1994.

On 10 June 2003, Rozendal died in Willemstad, Curaçao at the age of 74.

== Honours and legacy ==
- Netherlands Knight of the Order of the Netherlands Lion
- Venezuela Commander of the Order of the Liberator

== See also ==
- Rozendal cabinet
