= Ernesto Petronia =

Politician of the Netherlands Antilles

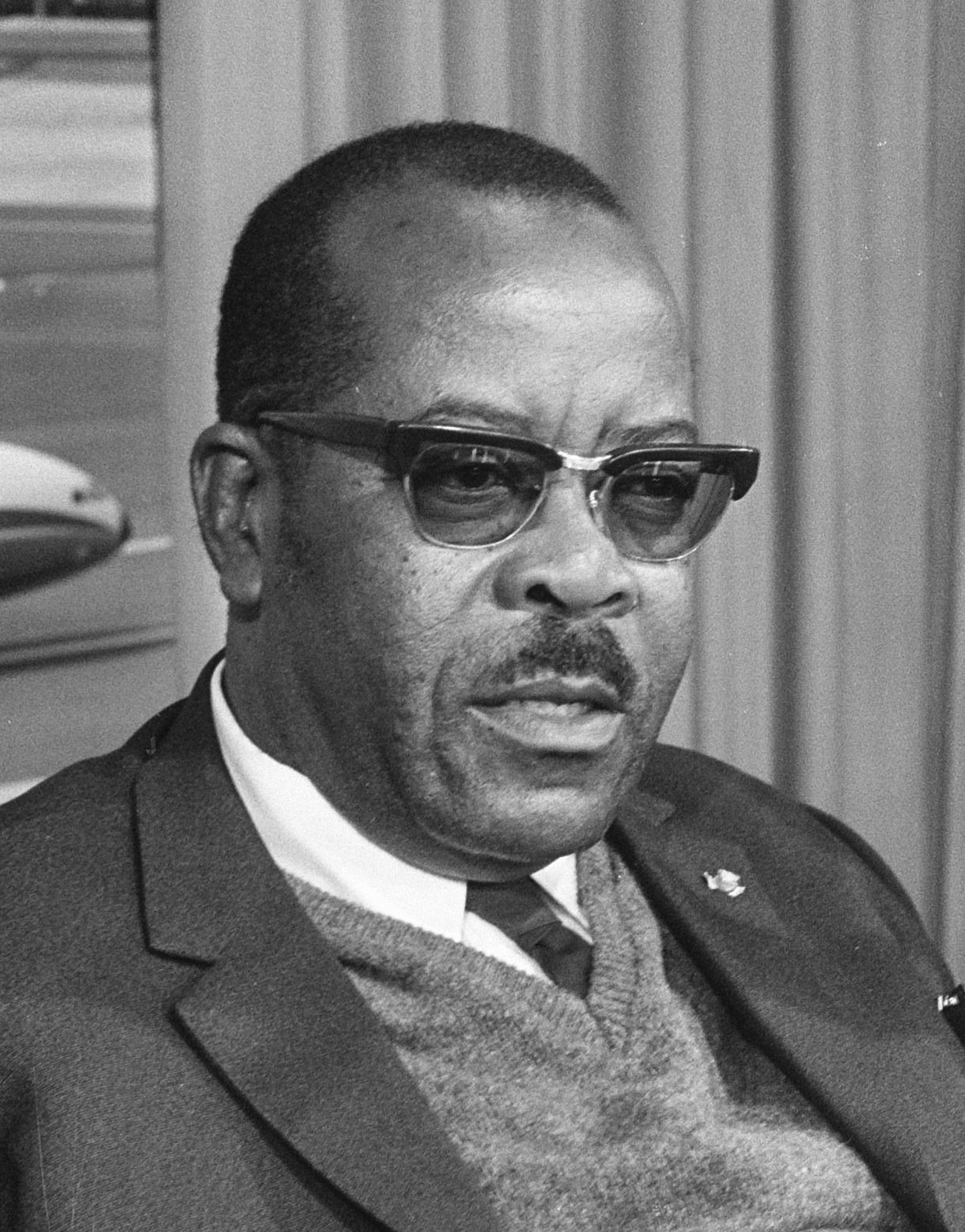
- Petronia (1970)

Minister of Justice of the Netherlands Antilles
- In office 12 February 1971 – 20 December 1973

Prime Minister of the Netherlands Antilles
- In office 12 December 1969 – 12 February 1971
- Monarch: Queen Juliana
- Preceded by: Gerald Sprockel a.i.
- Succeeded by: Ronchi Isa

Personal details
- Born: Ernesto Otilio Petronia; 14 December 1916 Santa Lucia, Willemstad, Curaçao
- Died: 29 December 1993 (aged 77) Oranjestad, Aruba
- Party: Aruban Patriotic Party (PPA)
- Occupation: businessman and politician

Ernesto Otilio "Netto" Petronia (14 December 1916 – 29 December 1993) was an Curaçao-born Aruban businessman and politician. He served many times as a minister with multiple portfolios, and was Prime Minister of the Netherlands Antilles from 1969 until 1971.

== Biography ==
Petronia was born on 14 December 1916 on plantation Santa Lucia near Plantersrust in Curaçao which is nowadays part of Willemstad. After elementary school, he became a draughtsman for the civil service, and attended a course in technical drawing. In 1932, he published the novel Venganza di un amigo written in Papiamentu. In 1933, he was transferred to Aruba where he would remain for the rest of his life. On 1 February 1940, he resigned and founded the construction company Petronia & Croes together with his business partner Bonifacio Croes.

In 1951, Petronia was first elected to the island council of Aruba for the Aruban Patriotic Party (PPA). In June 1961, he was appointed Minister of Traffic and Communications in the Netherlands Antilles which had been vacant since 1959. In June 1962, he became Minister with three portfolios: Education, Traffic, and Culture. For a brief period, Petronia had five portfolios when Oscar Henriquez was appointed lieutenant governor of Aruba. In 1967, he served with a single portfolio as Minister of Education. Even though Petronia had been a Papiamentu author, he would encourage the use of Dutch as Minister of Education in order to increase opportunities for the Antilles.

The 1969 Curaçao uprising resulted in a collapse of the government, and the formation of an ad interim government led by Gerald Sprockel which would be a place holder until the 1969 elections. In November 1969, the Accords of Kralendijk resulted in a coalition government of five parties headed by Petronia. On 12 December 1969, Petronia was installed as Prime Minister of the Netherlands Antilles. Petronia was the first prime minister of the Antilles of African descent.

The Netherlands Antilles faced a high rate of unemployment and a large deficit. Petronia was of the opinion that the islands needed several years of stability, however he doubted whether it could be achieved during his term. In December 1970, a tax increase failed to pass the Estates, and Petronia handed in his resignation. On 12 February 1971, the Isa-Beaujon cabinet was formed, in which Petronia served as Minister of Justice until 20 December 1973.

Petronia died on 29 December 1993 in Oranjestad, Aruba, at the age of 77.

== Honours and legacy ==
- Netherlands Commander in the Order of Orange-Nassau.
- In 1970, Amigoe, the leading newspaper in the Netherlands Antilles, named Petronia man of the year.
- In 1994, the Boerhaavestraat in Oranjestad was renamed Caya Ernesto Petronia.

== See also ==
- Petronia cabinet
