= Otto Beaujon =

Politician of the Netherlands Antilles

Prime Minister of the Netherlands Antilles
- In office 1 June 1971 – 15 November 1972
- Monarch: Queen Juliana
- Preceded by: Ronchi Isa
- Succeeded by: Ronchi Isa

Speaker of the Estates of the Netherlands Antilles
- In office 12 December 1966 – 16 May 1968

Personal details
- Born: Otto Rudolf Anthony Beaujon; 6 November 1915 Aruba, Curaçao and Dependencies
- Died: 12 November 1984 (aged 68) Willemstad, Curaçao, Netherlands Antilles
- Party: Democratic Party
- Occupation: civil servant, politician

Otto Rudolf Anthony Beaujon (6 November 1915 – 12 November 1984) was a civil servant and politician of the Netherlands Antilles. Beaujon served as Speaker of the Estates of the Netherlands Antilles between 1966 and 1968, and Prime Minister of the Netherlands Antilles from 1 June 1971 until 15 November 1972.

== Biography ==
Beaujon was born on 6 November 1915 in Aruba where his father Hendrik Johannes Beaujon was gezaghebber (lieutenant-governor). The family later moved to Curaçao. In 1933, he started to work as a civil servant, and obtained his praktizijn (non-academic law degree).

On 14 April 1955, Beaujon was first elected to the Estates of the Netherlands Antilles for the Democratic Party. On 12 December 1966, he was elected Speaker of the Estates and served until 16 May 1968. On 18 June 1968, he was appointed gezaghebber (lieutenant-governor) of Curaçao.

Beaujon served as Minister of Education and Culture from 12 December 1969 until 15 December 1970, and from 12 February 1971 until 2 June 1971. On 1 June 1971, Beaujon was elected Prime Minister of the Netherlands Antilles. In October 1972, he announced his resignation effective 15 November 1972.

Beaujon died on 12 November 1984, at the age of 69.

== Honours ==
- Netherlands Commander of the Order of Orange-Nassau.
- Venezuela Knight of the Order of the Liberator.
- Dominican Republic Grand Cross of the Order of Merit of Duarte, Sánchez and Mella.
