= Lucina da Costa Gomez-Matheeuws =

Dutch politician

Prime Minister of the Netherlands Antilles
- In office 4 October 1977 – 14 October 1977
- Monarch: Juliana of the Netherlands
- Preceded by: Leo A.I. Chance
- Succeeded by: Boy Rozendal

Minister of Health and Environment, Welfare, Youth, Sports, Culture and Recreation
- In office 1970–1977

Personal details
- Born: 5 April 1929
- Died: 7 January 2017 (aged 87)
- Spouse: Moises Frumencio da Costa Gomez

Lucina Elena da Costa Gomez-Matheeuws (5 April 1929 – 7 January 2017) was a Dutch Antillean politician for the National People's Party (PNP). She served as the ad interim Prime Minister of the Netherlands Antilles, an office her husband Moises Frumencio da Costa Gomez previously held, briefly in 1977. She was also the first female to hold the office. Prior to this, she was the Minister of Health and Environment, Welfare, Youth, Sports, Culture and Recreation (1970–1977).

Costa Gomez-Matheeuws died on 7 January 2017 at the age of 87.

Political offices
Preceded by Leo A.I. Chance	Prime Minister of the Netherlands Antilles; 1977	Succeeded by Boy Rozendal
