= Miguel Pourier =

Netherlands Antilles politician (1938–2013)

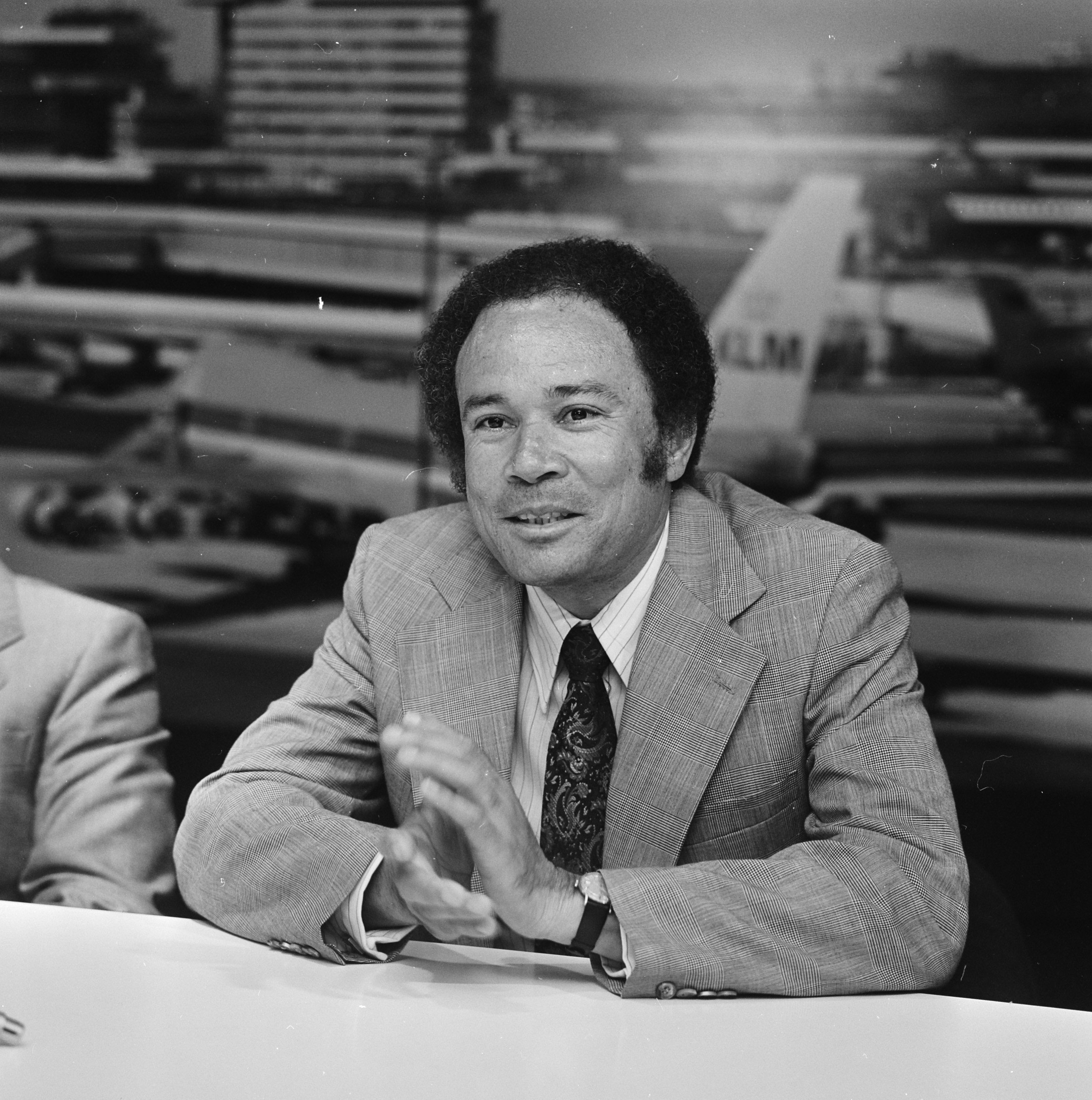

Prime Minister of the Netherlands Antilles
- In office 8 November 1999 – 3 June 2002
- Preceded by: Suzanne Camelia-Römer
- Succeeded by: Etienne Ys
- In office 31 March 1994 – 14 May 1998
- Preceded by: Alejandro Felipe Paula
- Succeeded by: Suzanne Camelia-Römer
- In office 6 July 1979 – December 1979
- Preceded by: Boy Rozendal
- Succeeded by: Don Martina

Personal details
- Born: Miguel Arcangel Pourier; 29 September 1938 Rincon, Bonaire
- Died: 23 March 2013 (aged 74) Curaçao
- Party: Bonaire Patriotic Union; Real Alternative Party

Miguel Arcangel Pourier (29 September 1938 – 23 March 2013) served as Prime Minister of the Netherlands Antilles three times. He first served from 6 July 1979 to December 1979; he next served from 31 March 1994 to 14 May 1998 and he last served from 8 November 1999 to 3 June 2002. He belonged to the Bonaire Patriotic Union (UPB) and Party for the Restructured Antilles (PAR). He was born in Rincon, Bonaire.

From 1973 he served as Minister for Development Cooperation in the cabinet of Juancho Evertsz and later served as Minister for Finance and Economic Affairs.
