= Elections in Saba =

Saba holds elections for the island council and the electoral colleges for the Senate.

== Latest elections ==
Party	Votes	%	Seats	+/–
Windward Islands People's Movement	777	79.04	5	+2
Saba Labour Party	125	12.72	0	–2
Blank list (United People Movement)	81	8.24	0	–
Invalid/blank votes	7	–	–	–
Total	983	100	5	0
Registered voters/turnout	1,078	92.12	–	–
Source: Saba News, Saba News

== Past Elections ==
Historical distribution of Island Council seats
Party	2019	2015	2011	2007	2003	1999	1995	1991	1987
Windward Islands People's Movement (WIPM)	5	3	4	4	3	4	2	4	2
Saba Labour Party (SLP)	0	2	1	1	0	1	-	-	-
Saba United Democratic Party (SUDP)	-	-	-	-	2	-	-	-	-
Saba Democratic Labour Movement (SDLM)	-	-	-	-	-	-	3	1	3
Total	5	5	5	5	5	5	5	5	5

== See also ==
- Electoral calendar
- Electoral system
