= 1983 Netherlands Antilles island council elections =

← 1979	29 April 1983 (ABC islands); 6 May 1983 (SSS islands)	1987 →

All 68 seats in the island councils of Aruba (21), Bonaire (9), Curaçao (21), Saba (5), Sint Eustatius (5) and Sint Maarten (7)

Island council elections were held in the Netherlands Antilles on 29 April (ABC islands) and 6 May 1983 (SSS islands) to elect the members of the island councils of its six island territories. The election was won by the People's Electoral Movement (13 seats) in Aruba, the Bonaire Democratic Party (5 seats) in Bonaire, the New Antilles Movement (8 seats) in Curaçao, the Windward Islands People's Movement (4 seats) in Saba, the Democratic Party Statia (3 seats) in Sint Eustatius, and the Democratic Party (5 seats) in Sint Maarten.

== Shooting of Betico Croes ==
During the campaign in Aruba, an incident occurred at an illegally organized car parade of the People's Electoral Movement (MEP) in Santa Cruz on 24 April 1983. The rally was to be held on the same day as the car parade of the Aruban People's Party (AVP), but unlike the AVP, the MEP did not have permission from the local police. When MEP leader Betico Croes began mobilizing 500 cars for the parade, a warning shot was fired by a police officer. A second shot hit Croes in the abdomen.

Croes was taken to the Dr. Horacio E. Oduber Hospital in Oranjestad, where his spleen was removed and the bleeding was stopped. Directly after the shooting, riots occurred, in response to which Lieutenant Governor Pedro Bislip ordered to close all bars and prohibit the sale of alcohol on the island until further notice. Five days later, the MEP won the election with 57.9% of the popular vote.

== Results ==
=== Aruba ===
Party	Votes	%	Seats	+/–
People's Electoral Movement	20,798	57.94	13	+1
Aruban People's Party	8,102	22.57	5	+1
Aruban Patriotic Party	5,354	14.91	3	0
Aruban Democratic Party	1,644	4.58	0	New
Total	35,898	100.00	21	0
Source: CBS

=== Bonaire ===
Party	Votes	%	Seats	+/–
Bonaire Democratic Party	2,371	47.72	5	+1
Bonaire Patriotic Union	2,184	43.95	4	−1
United Bonaire Progressive Party	246	4.95	0	0
New Action Party	168	3.38	0	0
Total	4,969	100.00	9	–
Source: CBS

=== Curaçao ===
Party	Votes	%	Seats	+/–
New Antilles Movement	23,391	33.84	8	+2
National People's Party	23,249	33.63	7	+2
Democratic Party	14,799	21.41	5	–1
Workers' Liberation Front	4,503	6.51	1	0
Social Democratic Party	1,744	2.52	0	−3
META	1,444	2.09	0	0
Total	69,130	100.00	21	–
Registered voters/turnout	104,328	–		
Source: CBS

=== Saba ===
The result was a victory for the Windward Islands People's Movement, which won four of the five seats in the Island Council of Saba.

Party	Votes	%	Seats	+/–
Windward Islands People's Movement	470	77.43	4	–1
Democratic Party	137	22.57	1	New
Total	607	100.00	5	0
Source: CBS

=== Sint Eustatius ===
Party	Votes	%	Seats	+/–
Democratic Party	400	52.98	3	+1
Windward Islands People's Movement	355	47.02	2	−1
Total	755	100.00	5	0
Source: CBS, Algemeen Dagblad

=== Sint Maarten ===
The Island Council seats increased from five to seven. The result was a victory for the Democratic Party, which won five of the seven Island Council seats.

Party	Votes	%	Seats	+/–
Democratic Party	3,342	66.85	5	+2
Sint Maarten Patriotic Movement	1,443	28.87	2	0
Partido Pro Penshonado	191	3.82	0	New
New Electoral Movement of Antilles	23	0.46	0	New
Total	4,999	100.00	7	+2
Source: CBS
