= 2002 Netherlands Antilles general election =

General elections in the Netherlands Antilles took place on 18 January 2002.

== Results ==
Party	Island	Votes	%	Seats
Workers' Liberation Front	Curaçao	18,383	22.24	5
Party for the Restructured Antilles	Curaçao	16,443	19.89	4
National People's Party	Curaçao	10,706	12.95	3
People's Crusade Labour Party	Curaçao	9,695	11.73	2
Democratic Party Sint Maarten	Sint Maarten	4,225	5.11	2
New Antilles Movement	Curaçao	4,174	5.05	0
National Alliance	Sint Maarten	3,829	4.63	1
Bonaire Patriotic Union	Bonaire	2,882	3.49	2
Organisahon pa Restourashon Di Un i tur	Curaçao	2,969	3.59	0
C-93	Curaçao	2,382	2.88	0
Bonaire Democratic Party	Bonaire	2,084	2.52	1
Democratic Party Curaçao	Curaçao	1,903	2.30	0
Bonaire Social Party	Bonaire	823	1.00	0
Democratic Party Sint Eustatius	Sint Eustatius	419	0.51	1
Windward Islands People's Movement	Saba	380	0.46	1
Progressive Labour Party	Sint Eustatius	346	0.42	0
P-100	Curaçao	273	0.33	0
Saba Labour Party	Saba	170	0.21	0
Sint Eustatius Alliance	Sint Eustatius	139	0.17	0
PAN	Curaçao	117	0.14	0
BBB-S	Curaçao	106	0.13	0
POB	Bonaire	104	0.13	0
St. Eustatius Action Movement	Sint Eustatius	75	0.09	0
National Democratic Party	Sint Maarten	42	0.05	0
Total		82,669	100.00	22
Source: The Daily Herald, Statistical Yearbook
