= 2007 Netherlands Antilles island council elections =

← 2003	20 April 2007	2011 (Netherlands) →
- All 51 seats in the island councils of Bonaire (9), Curaçao (21), Saba (5), Sint Eustatius (5) and Sint Maarten (11)
Party	Leader	Vote %	Seats	+/–
Elected in Bonaire
UPB	Ramonsito Booi	51.22	5	−1
ADB	Jopie Abraham	39.91	4	+1
Elected in Curaçao
PAR	Emily de Jongh-Elhage	28.02	7	+2
MAN	Charles Cooper	18.70	5	+3
FOL	Anthony Godett	10.27	2	−6
PNP	Ersilia de Lannooy	10.15	2	0
LNPA	Nelson Pierre	8.47	2	+1
PS	Helmin Wiels	7.38	1	New
FK	Nelson Navarro	6.63	1	New
DP	Norbert George	5.12	1	+1
(Saba (island)) Elected in Saba
WIPM	Ray Hassell	73.76	4	+1
SLP	Akilah Levenstone	26.24	1	+1
Elected in Sint Eustatius
DP	Julian Woodley	55.36	4	+1
PLP	Clyde van Putten	23.83	1	−1
Elected in Sint Maarten
DP	Sarah Wescot-Williams	49.48	6	0
NA	William Marlin	41.33	5	+1
This lists parties that won seats. See the complete results below.

Island council elections were held in the Netherlands Antilles on 20 April 2007 to elect the members of the island councils of its five island territories. They were the last regular island council elections before the dissolution of the Netherlands Antilles in 2010.

The election was won by the Bonaire Patriotic Union (5 seats) in Bonaire, the Party for the Restructured Antilles (7 seats) in Curaçao, the Windward Islands People's Movement (4 seats) in Saba, the Democratic Party Statia (4 seats) in Sint Eustatius, and the Democratic Party (6 seats) in Sint Maarten.

== Results ==
=== Bonaire ===
Party	Votes	%	Seats	+/–
Bonaire Patriotic Union	3,664	51.22	5	–1
Democratic Alliance	2,855	39.91	4	+1
PRO	583	8.15	0	–
Alerta	52	0.73	0	–
Total	7,154	100.00	9	0
Registered voters/turnout		83.9		
Source: The Bonaire Reporter

=== Curaçao ===
Party	Votes	%	Seats	+/–
Party for the Restructured Antilles	20,862	28.02	7	+2
Partido MAN	13,923	18.70	5	+3
Workers' Liberation Front	7,648	10.27	2	–6
National People's Party	7,558	10.15	2	0
Lista Niun Paso Atras	6,304	8.47	2	+1
Sovereign People	5,494	7.38	1	New
Forsa Kòrsou	4,932	6.63	1	New
Democratic Party	3,813	5.12	1	+1
Un Pueblo Nobo	1,651	2.22	0	New
People's Crusade Labour Party	1,227	1.65	0	–3
Social Labour Movement	1,032	1.39	0	New
Total	74,444	100.00	21	0
Valid votes	74,444	99.37		
Invalid/blank votes	469	0.63		
Total votes	74,913	100.00		
Registered voters/turnout	112,541	66.57		
Source: Hoofdstembureau Curaçao

=== Saba ===
Party	Votes	%	Seats	+/–
Windward Islands People's Movement	447	73.76	4	+1
Saba Labour Party	159	26.24	1	+1
Total	606	100.00	5	0
Valid votes	606	98.54		
Invalid/blank votes	9	1.46		
Total votes	615	100.00		
Source: The Daily Herald, Saba Tourist Bureau

=== Sint Eustatius ===
Party	Votes	%	Seats	+/–
Democratic Party	625	55.36	4	+1
Progressive Labour Party	269	23.83	1	–1
St. Eustatius Empowerment Party	211	18.69	0	New
Cyril B. Tearr	24	2.13	0	0
Total	1,129	100.00	5	0
Valid votes	1,129	98.34		
Invalid/blank votes	19	1.66		
Total votes	1,148	100.00		
Registered voters/turnout	1,517	75.68		
Source: The Daily Herald

=== Sint Maarten ===
Party	Votes	%	Seats	+/–
Democratic Party	6,635	49.48	6	0
National Alliance	5,542	41.33	5	+1
People's Progressive Alliance	1,119	8.34	0	–1
Democratic Labour Party	69	0.51	0	0
St. Maarten People's Believers Independent Movement	25	0.19	0	0
Freedom Slate of the National Democratic Party	20	0.15	0	0
Total	13,410	100.00	11	0
Registered voters/turnout	19,151	–		
Source: IslandStudies.ca, SXM Elections, Governor of St. Maarten
