= Democratic Party (Curaçao) =

Democratic Party Partido Democraat Democratische Partij
- Leader: George Hernandez
- Founded: 1944
- Ideology: Liberalism
- Political position: Centre
- Colours: Red

The Democratic Party (Papiamento: Partido Democraat, Dutch: Democratische Partij) is a liberal party in Curaçao founded in 1944. The party has participated in elections for the Estates of the Netherlands Antilles (Curaçao constituency) and the Island Council of Curaçao until the dissolution of the Netherlands Antilles in 2010, obtaining a single seat in the island council in 2007.

By obtaining 1019 registrations of support, the party qualified (a minimum of 743 was required) for participation in the Curaçao General Election of 2012 on 19 October in a combined list with Laboral named Partido Democrat Laboral, where it obtained 1.2% of the votes but failed to obtain any seats. In the primary elections of 2016, the party received 1094 votes, again sufficient for participation, but did not end up winning any seats.

== Election results ==
From 1954 until 1978, the party was part of the government of the Netherlands Antilles led by prime-minister Efrain Jonckheer, but it did not have any seats in the Estates of the Netherlands Antilles from 1995. At the legislative elections in the Netherlands Antilles, 18 January 2002, the party won 2.4% of the popular vote and none of the 14 Curaçao-seats in the Estates of the Netherlands Antilles. It took part in the elections of 27 2006 and 2010 where it obtained 3.7% and 2.5% of the vote of Curaçao respectively, but failed to win a seat.

In 2007, the party obtained a single seat in the island council (with 5% of the vote). At the Island Council elections of 2010, DP obtained 4% of the vote (3048 votes), about 500 votes shy of a seat in the Island Council (and its successor: the Estates of Curaçao).

Year	Votes	%	Seats	+/–
1945	2,122	39.72	3 / 5	▲3
1949	10,006	22.63	3 / 8	Steady
1950	11,269	23.75	4 / 12	▲1
1951			8 / 21	
1954	13,620		5 / 12	▲1
1955			9 / 21	▲1
1958	18,771	28.57	5 / 12	Steady
1959			9 / 21	
1962	18,953	27.40	5 / 12	Steady
1963			9 / 21	
1966			7 / 12	▲2
1967			13 / 21	
1969			6 / 12	▼1
1971			7 / 21	▲3
1973			4 / 12	▼2
1975			4 / 21	▼3
1977			6 / 12	▲2
1979			6 / 21	▲2
1979			3 / 12	
1982			3 / 12	
1983			5 / 21	▼1
1985			3 / 12	
1987	13,879	19.49	4 / 21	▼1
1990			1 / 12	
1991	6,624	9.39	2 / 21	▼2
1994			1 / 12	
1995	4,654	6.61	1 / 21	▼1
1998			0 / 12	
1999	2,931	4.15	0 / 21	▼1
2002	1,903	2.30		
2003	2,519	3.75	0 / 21	
2006	2,638	2.96	0 / 14	
2007	3,813	5.12	1 / 21	▲1
2010	1,815		0 / 14	
2010	3,048	4.10	0 / 21	▼1
2012	1,127	1.30	0 / 21	
2016	1,963	2.48	0 / 21	
2017	Did not contest			
2021	2,388	2.81	0 / 21	

== See also ==
- Democratic Party Sint Maarten
- Democratic Party (Sint Eustatius)
- Liberalism worldwide
