= 1991 Netherlands Antilles island council elections =

← 1987	12 April 1991	1995 →

All 49 seats in the island councils of Bonaire (9), Curaçao (21), Saba (5), Sint Eustatius (5) and Sint Maarten (9)

Island council elections were held in the Netherlands Antilles on 12 April 1991 to elect the members of the island councils of its five island territories. The election was won by the Bonaire Patriotic Union (6 seats) in Bonaire, the National People's Party (10 seats) in Curaçao, the Windward Islands People's Movement (4 seats) in Saba, and the Sint Maarten Patriotic Alliance (4 seats) in Sint Maarten.

== Results ==
=== Bonaire ===
Party	Votes	%	Seats
Bonaire Patriotic Union	2,763	52.18	6
Bonaire Social Party	1,080	20.40	2
Bonaire Democratic Party	809	15.28	1
Bonaire Workers' Party	487	9.20	0
Caribbean Alliance for Solidarity	156	2.95	0
Total	5,295	100.00	9

=== Curaçao ===
Party	Votes	%	Seats	+/–
National People's Party	33,152	47.02	10	+2
Workers' Liberation Front–Soshal Independiente	16,592	23.53	5	+2
New Antilles Movement	10,360	14.69	3	–3
Democratic Party	6,624	9.39	2	–2
Nos Patria	3,780	5.36	1	New
Total	70,508	100.00	21	–

=== Saba ===
Party	Votes	%	Seats	+/–
Windward Islands People's Movement	438	72.04	4	+2
Saba Democratic Labour Movement	170	27.96	1	–2
Total	608	100.00	5	–

=== Sint Eustatius ===
Party	Votes	%	Seats
Democratic Party	491	57.90	3
Sint Eustatius Alliance	357	42.10	2
Total	848	100.00	5

=== Sint Maarten ===
The Sint Maarten Patriotic Alliance (SPA) led by Vance James Jr. emerged as the largest party, winning 4 of the 9 seats. The SPA and the Progressive Democratic Party (PDP) agreed to form a coalition government. On 28 August 1991 the SPA–PDP government collapsed. PDP political leader Millicent Acuna Lopez-de Weever said that "fundamental philosophical differences" with the SPA caused the coalition "to break".

Party	Votes	%	Seats	+/–
Sint Maarten Patriotic Alliance	3,457	39.90	4	+2
Democratic Party	2,873	33.16	3	–4
Progressive Democratic Party	1,745	20.14	2	New
National Reformation Party	438	5.05	0	New
United Democratic Party	69	0.80	0	New
Antillean National Movement	36	0.42	0	New
People's Electoral Movement	28	0.32	0	New
Partido Pro Penshonado	19	0.22	0	New
Total	8,665	100.00	9	–
