= 1995 Netherlands Antilles island council elections =

← 1991	7 April and 12 May 1995	1999 →

All 51 seats in the island councils of Bonaire (9), Curaçao (21), Saba (5), Sint Eustatius (5) and Sint Maarten (11)

Island council elections were held in the Netherlands Antilles on 7 April (Bonaire and Sint Maarten) and 12 May 1995 (Curaçao, Saba and Sint Eustatius) to elect the members of the island councils of its five island territories. The election was won by the Bonaire Democratic Party (5 seats) in Bonaire, the Party for the Restructured Antilles (8 seats) in Curaçao, the Saba Democratic Labour Movement (3 seats) in Saba, the Democratic Party Statia (3 seats) in Sint Eustatius, and the Democratic Party (7 seats) in Sint Maarten.

== Results ==
=== Bonaire ===
Party	Votes	%	Seats	+/–
Bonaire Democratic Party	2,784	47.97	5	+4
Bonaire Patriotic Union	1,517	26.14	2	–4
Bonaire Social Party	1,160	19.99	2	0
Bonaire Workers' Party	141	2.43	0	0
ASP	118	2.03	0	0
DDP	84	1.45	0	0
Total	5,804	100.00	9	0

=== Curaçao ===
Party	Votes	%	Seats	+/–
Party for the Restructured Antilles	24,080	33.93	8	New
New Antilles Movement	19,774	27.86	6	+3
National People's Party	11,903	16.77	4	–6
Workers' Liberation Front	6,822	9.61	2	–3
Democratic Party	5,006	7.05	1	–1
Soshal Independiente	1,773	2.50	0	0
Nos Patria	1,619	2.28	0	–1
Total	70,977	100.00	21	0

=== Saba ===
Party	Votes	%	Seats	+/–
Saba Democratic Labour Movement	346	54.40	3	+2
Windward Islands People's Movement	290	45.60	2	–2
Total	636	100.00	5	0

=== Sint Eustatius ===
Party	Votes	%	Seats	+/–
Democratic Party	547	57.94	3	0
Sint Eustatius Alliance	397	42.06	2	0
Total	944	100.00	5	0

=== Sint Maarten ===
The Democratic Party and the Sint Maarten Patriotic Alliance both won five seats, with the other seat in the 11-seat island council going to the Serious Alternative People's Party. The DP and SAPP agreed to form a coalition government.

Party	Votes	%	Seats	+/–
Democratic Party	4,324	45.81	5	+2
Sint Maarten Patriotic Alliance	4,178	44.26	5	+1
Serious Alternative People's Party	861	9.12	1	New
Progressive Labour Movement	76	0.81	0	New
Total	9,439	100.00	11	+2
