= 1971 Netherlands Antilles island council elections =

Island council elections were held in the Netherlands Antilles in 1971. They were the sixth elections for the Island Council,

== Aruba ==
General elections were held in Aruba in 1971. They were the first in which the People's Electoral Movement participated, after Gilberto Croes split from the AVP.

Party	Votes	%	Seats	+/–
Aruban Patriotic Party	12,039	51.12	11	+1
People's Electoral Movement	8,099	34.39	7	New
Aruban People's Party	3,413	14.49	3	–5
Total	23,551	100.00	21	0

== Bonaire ==
Party	Votes	%	Seats
Bonairean Workers' Party	1,046	29.18	3
Bonaire Democratic Party	1,044	29.12	3
PPB	966	26.95	2
United Progressive Bonairean Party	529	14.76	1
Total	3,585	100.00	9

== Curaçao ==
Party	Votes	%	Seats
Democratic Party	17,350	32.45	7
National People's Party/U	16,680	31.20	7
Workers' Liberation Front	8,220	15.37	3
MASA	7,245	13.55	3
Partido MAN	3,972	7.43	1
Total	53,467	100.00	21

== Windward Islands ==
General elections were held in the Windward Islands on 7 May 1971 to elect the 15 members of the Island Council. The result was a victory for the Democratic Party, which won four of the 8 Island Council seats.

Party	Votes	%	Seats
Democratic Party	1,720	54.40	8
Windward Islands People's Movement	1,152	36.43	7
People's Progressive Movement	290	9.17	0
Total	3,162	100.00	15
