= Workers' Liberation Front (Curaçao) =

Workers' Liberation Front Frente Obrero Liberashon
- Leader: Anthony Godett (1995-2016)
- Founded: 5 June 1969; 56 years ago
- Headquarters: Kanga, Willemstad, Curaçao
- Ideology: Social democracy Populism
- Political position: Centre-left to left-wing
- Regional affiliation: COPPPAL (Observer)
- Colours: Orange
- Slogan: Sin Miedu (Without Fear)

The Workers' Liberation Front (Dutch: Arbeiders Bevrijdingsfront, Papiamento: Frente Obrero Liberashon, FOL), officially the 30 May Workers' Liberation Front Party (Dutch: Arbeiders Bevrijdingsfront van 30 mei, Papiamento: Partido Frente Obrero Liberashon 30 Di Mei), is a social-democratic populist political party in Curaçao founded in 1969. The party participated in the general elections for the Curaçao constituency in the Estates of the Netherlands Antilles and the Curaçao Island council until the dissolution of the Netherlands Antilles in 2010. After losing its seat in the Estates of Curaçao following the 2012 Curaçao general election, the party is no longer represented in the Curaçao legislature.

== Netherlands Antilles ==
The party was founded in 1969 and named after the riots/uprising of 30 May. When Wilson Godett and Stanley Brown were elected in the Estates of the Netherlands Antilles, they were still in jail for their connections with the riots; but their upcoming membership in the Estates set them free. During the 2002 and 2006 elections respectively, the party won 5 and 2 of the 14 Curaçao-seats in the 22 seat Estates of the Netherlands Antilles, but during the 2010 election the party failed to obtain any seats.

In 2003, the party obtained eight seats and became the largest party in the 21-seat island council (with 34% of the vote), dropping to 2 seats in 2007. The party delivered two prime-ministers of the Netherlands Antilles: Ben Komproe and Mirna Louisa-Godett. The latter was only appointed as Governor Frits Goedgedrag refused to inaugurate her brother (and son of Wilson Godett) Anthony Godett. The single seat the party obtained in the Island council election of 2010 (held by Anthony Godett) automatically became a seat in the Estates of Curaçao upon the Dissolution of the Netherlands Antilles in 2010.

== Election results ==
During the elections of 2012, the party participated in the elections, obtaining 1,790 votes (2.1%). This was not enough for a seat. The party participated in order to qualify for participating in the elections in 2016 and 2017, in which it needed to obtain 870 and 792 votes respectively (1% of the turnout in the previous elections). The party did not manage to do so in 2016 (with 622 votes), but in 2017 it did, in a joint list with Partido Aliansa Nobo (1,124 votes). It did not obtain a seat in the parliament in the 2017 elections.

Election	Votes	%	Seats	+/–	Leader
1969			3 / 12	▲3	Wilson Godett
1973			3 / 12	0	Wilson Godett
1977			3 / 12	0	Wilson Godett
1979			0 / 12	▼3	Wilson Godett
1982			0 / 12	0	Wilson Godett
1985			1 / 14	▲1	Wilson Godett
1990			3 / 14	▲2	Wilson Godett
1994			0 / 14	▼3	Wilson Godett
1998			2 / 14	▲2	Anthony Godett
2002	18,383	22.24	5 / 14	▲3	Anthony Godett
2006	9,582	13.59	2 / 14	▼3	Anthony Godett
2010	4,354		0 / 14	▼2	Anthony Godett

Curaçao general elections
Year	Leader	Votes	%	Seats	+/– seats
1971	Wilson Godett	?	?	3 / 21	▲3
1975	Wilson Godett	?	?	8 / 21	▲5
1979	Wilson Godett	?	?	1 / 21	▼7
1983	Wilson Godett	4,503	6.51	1 / 21	0
1987	Wilson Godett	5,386	7.56	1 / 21	0
1991	Wilson Godett	16,603	23.54	5 / 21	▲4
1995	Anthony Godett	6,841	9.72	2 / 21	▼3
1999	Anthony Godett	12,631	17.90	4 / 21	▲2
2003	Anthony Godett	22,745	33.86	8 / 21	▲4
2007	Anthony Godett	7,648	10.27	2 / 21	▼6
2010	Anthony Godett	4,813	6.47	1 / 21	▼1
2012	Anthony Godett	1,790	2.06	0 / 21	▼1
2016	Did not contest				
2017		859	1.09	0 / 21	0
2021	Did not contest				

== Candidates ==
2007				2010				2012			
Nr.	Name	Sex	Votes	Nr.	Name	Sex	Votes	Nr.	Name	Sex	Votes
1.	Anthony Amadeo Godett	male	3767	1.	Anthony Amadeo Godett	male	3005	1.	Anthony Amadeo Godett	male	925
2.	Renfred A. Rojer		353	2.	Junïel Reinaldo Carolina	male	362	2.	Junïel Reinaldo Carolina	male	125
3.	Jacinta Venancia Adelaida Constancia	female	1296	3.	Almier M. Godett	male	253	3.	Irving Charles Jano	male	131
4.	Julio G. Constansia	male	633	4.	Julio G. Constansia	male	120	4.	Maricel Irene Sakoetoe	female	63
5.	Junïel Reinaldo Carolina	male	230	5.	Jefferdion G.R. Polonius	male	72	5.	Eddy Genaro Desiderio Balentien	male	17
6.	J.E. Louisa		72	6.	Edmiro P. Jansen	male	50	6.	Edmiro Pedro Jansen	male	15
7.	Ivan A. Strick	male	99	7.	Maria C.H.C.R. Nita		78	7.	Leonel Clement Abrahams	male	59
8.	E.E. Capella		108	8.	Jagdish J. Oedjaghir	male	85	8.	Vladimir Omar Garcia	male	39
9.	R.A. Sling		117	9.	Ronald A. Carolina	male	31	9.	Rennox Francis Calmes	male	41
10.	Hubert A. Rojer	male	63	10.	Frensel José Marchena	male	66	10.	Jason Oliver Matthew	male	27
11.	R.D.A. Douglass		47	11.	Ramsey Leonardo Betorina	male	35	11.	Edison Johannes Antonius E. Maduro	male	22
12.	R.J. Ocalia		48	12.	Rennox Francis Calmes	male	61	12.	Frensel José Marchena	male	15
13.	Mayerdith Anicleta Bouwland-Luciano	female	44	13.	Emanuel, Humfried A.	male	21	13.	Mayerdith Anicleta Bouwland-Luciano	female	27
14.	Maricel Irene Sakoetoe	female	70	14.	Leonel Clement Abrahams	male	80	14.	Verlon Jason Bernardo Donker	male	39
15.	H.M. Römer-van Rossum	female	32	15.	Samuel E.F.R. Rose	male	41	15.	Hensley Gordiano Martina	male	27
16.	E.G. Kowsoleea		37	16.	Ivan A. Strick	male	34	16.	Richenel S.M. Meulens	male	14
17.	M.N.J. Rojer		45	17.	Rignald J. Ocalia		49	17.	Ramsey Leonardo Betorina	male	27
18.	Almier M. Godett	male	153	18.	Dominique L.M.F. Adriaens		16	18.	Kenneth Eusebio Filesia	male	26
19.	M.L.B. Martes		9	19.	Jerrel R. Constancia	male	26	19.	Carolaine Birginia Ilario	female	17
20.	E.E. Ignecia		33	20.	Hubert A. Rojer	male	25	20.	Eliseo Galverio Balyn	male	30
21.	L.T. Girigori		45	21.	Harryson F. Martijn	male	31	21.	Ernesto Antonio Bernardina	male	11
22.	A.J. Koeiman		36	22.	Edison Johannes Antonius E. Maduro	male	34	22.	Richard Eldemiro Josefa	male	2
23.	V.E. Krips		64	23.	Humphrey F.S.Kwidama	male	27	23.	Robert Eduard A. Rosales	male	10
24.	Leonel Clement Abrahams	male	21	24.	Lery A.L. Regales		16	24.	Herbert Nicolás de Tolentino Balentina	male	13
25.	R.R.P. Balentien		18	25.	Richenel S.M. Meulens	male	20	25.	Gilbert Francisco Felicia	male	3
26.	Maurice Hubert Pierre Philippe Adriaens	male	51	26.	Sidney G. Capella		19	26.	Luïgi Kronstadt	male	13
27.	Edison Johannes Antonius E. Maduro	male	67	27.	Verlon Jason Bernardo Donker	male	56	27.	Michael Constantino Girigorie	male	7
28.	E.M. la Croes		8	28.	Gislaine S. Rogers	female	25	28.	Millicent Marlene Melania Gracia	female	4
29.	J.A. Clemencia		82	29.	Mirna Altecracia Louisa-Godett	female	75	29.	Mirna Altecracia Louisa-Godett	female	41
Total			7,648	Total			4,813	Total			1,790
