= 2024 Sint Maarten general election =

The 2024 Sint Maarten general election may refer to:

- January 2024 Sint Maarten general election
- August 2024 Sint Maarten general election
