= 2003 Netherlands Antilles island council elections =

- 9 May 2003 (Leeward Antilles); 23 May 2003 (SSS islands)
- All 51 seats in the island councils of Bonaire (9), Curaçao (21), Saba (5), Sint Eustatius (5) and Sint Maarten (11)
Party	Leader	Vote %	Seats	+/–
Elected in Bonaire
UPB	Ramonsito Booi		6	+2
PDB	Jopie Abraham		3	−1
Elected in Curaçao (top 2)
FOL	Anthony Godett	33.86	8	+4
PAR	Etienne Ys	20.41	5	0
PLKP		13.08	3	−1
PNP	Maria Liberia Peters	10.65	2	−3
MAN		9.34	2	0
LNPA	Nelson Pierre	5.69	1	New
(Saba (island)) Elected in Saba
WIPM	Ray Hassell	47.30	3	−1
SUDP	Steve Hassell	36.83	2	New
Elected in Sint Eustatius
DPS	Julian Woodley		3	+1
PLP	Clyde van Putten		2	New
Elected in Sint Maarten (top 2)
DP	Sarah Wescot-Williams	48.38	6	−1
NA	William Marlin	38.78	4	New
This lists parties that won seats. See the complete results below.

Island council elections were held in the Netherlands Antilles on 9 May (Bonaire and Curaçao) and 23 May 2003 (SSS islands) to elect the members of the island councils of its five island territories. The election was won by the Bonaire Patriotic Union (6 seats) in Bonaire, the Workers' Liberation Front (8 seats) in Curaçao, the Windward Islands People's Movement (3 seats) in Saba, the Democratic Party Statia (3 seats) in Sint Eustatius, and the Democratic Party (6 seats) in Sint Maarten.

== Results ==
=== Bonaire ===
Party	Votes	%	Seats	+/–
Bonaire Patriotic Union	2,967	49.60	6	+2
Bonaire Democratic Party	1,725	28.84	3	–1
PRO	650	10.87	0	0
Bonaire Social Party	420	7.02	0	–1
Bonaire Workers' Party	202	3.38	0	0
PHH	18	0.30	0	0
Total	5,982	100.00	9	0
Registered voters/turnout	7,699	–		

=== Curaçao ===
Party	Votes	%	Seats	+/–
Workers' Liberation Front	22,745	33.86	8	+4
Party for the Restructured Antilles	13,710	20.41	5	0
People's Crusade Labour Party	8,785	13.08	3	–1
National People's Party	7,153	10.65	2	–3
New Antilles Movement	6,274	9.34	2	0
Lista Niun Paso Atras	3,819	5.69	1	New
Democratic Party	2,519	3.75	0	0
Organisashon pa Restorashon di Un i Tur	2,168	3.23	0	–1
Total	67,173	100.00	21	0
Valid votes	67,173	98.61		
Invalid/blank votes	948	1.39		
Total votes	68,121	100.00		
Registered voters/turnout	109,629	62.14		

=== Saba ===
Party	Votes	%	Seats	+/–
Windward Islands People's Movement	298	47.30	3	–1
Saba United Democratic Party	232	36.83	2	New
Saba Labour Party	100	15.87	0	–1
Total	630	100.00	5	0

=== Sint Eustatius ===
Party	Votes	%	Seats	+/–
Democratic Party	471	42.51	3	+1
Progressive Labour Party	348	31.41	2	New
Sint Eustatius Alliance	160	14.44	0	–3
St. Eustatius Action Movement	107	9.66	0	0
PNDP	22	1.99	0	0
Total	1,108	100.00	5	0

=== Sint Maarten ===
Party	Votes	%	Seats	+/–
Democratic Party	4,919	72.57	6	–1
National Alliance			4	New
People's Progressive Alliance	1,158	17.08	1	New
National Progressive Party	378	5.58	0	0
Serious Alternative People's Party	206	3.04	0	0
PPLP	96	1.42	0	0
National Democratic Party	21	0.31	0	0
Total	6,778	100.00	11	0
