= 1999 Netherlands Antilles island council elections =

- 7 May 1999; 21 May 1999 (SX)

All 51 seats in the island councils of Bonaire (9), Curaçao (21), Saba (5), Sint Eustatius (5) and Sint Maarten (11)

Island council elections were held in the Netherlands Antilles on 7 May (Curaçao, Saba and Sint Eustatius) and 21 May 1999 (Sint Maarten) to elect the members of the island councils of its five island territories. The election was won by the Party for the Restructured Antilles (5 seats) in Curaçao, the Windward Islands People's Movement (4 seats) in Saba, the Sint Eustatius Alliance (3 seats) in Sint Eustatius, and the Democratic Party (7 seats) in Sint Maarten.

== Results ==
=== Bonaire ===
Party	Votes	%	Seats	+/–
Bonaire Democratic Party	2,762	42.57	4	–1
Bonaire Patriotic Union	2,613	40.27	4	+2
Bonaire Social Party	1,042	16.06	1	–1
Bonaire Workers' Party	71	1.09	0	0
Total	6,488	100.00	9	0

=== Curaçao ===
Party	Votes	%	Seats	+/–
Party for the Restructured Antilles	15,947	22.60	5	–3
National People's Party	15,516	21.99	5	+1
Workers' Liberation Front	12,631	17.90	4	+2
People's Crusade Labour Party	11,938	16.92	4	New
New Antilles Movement	6,951	9.85	2	–4
Organisashon pa Restorashon di Un i Tur	3,739	5.30	1	New
Democratic Party	2,931	4.15	0	–1
Partido Pais Kòrsou	909	1.29	0	New
Total	70,562	100.00	21	0

=== Saba ===
Party	Votes	%	Seats	+/–
Windward Islands People's Movement	400	70.67	4	+2
Saba Labour Party	126	22.26	1	New
Democratic Party of Saba	40	7.07	0	New
Total	566	100.00	5	0

=== Sint Eustatius ===
Party	Votes	%	Seats	+/–
Sint Eustatius Alliance	541	49.50	3	+1
Democratic Party	452	41.35	2	–1
St. Eustatius Action Movement	100	9.15	0	0
Total	1,093	100.00	5	0

=== Sint Maarten ===
Party	Votes	%	Seats	+/–
Democratic Party	5,599	54.44	7	+2
Sint Maarten Patriotic Alliance	2,859	27.80	3	–2
National Progressive Party	1,256	12.21	1	New
Serious Alternative People's Party	424	4.12	0	–1
Decision 1999	76	0.74	0	New
PPLP	64	0.62	0	New
St. Maarten Liberation Movement	7	0.07	0	New
Total	10,285	100.00	11	0
