= 1967 Netherlands Antilles island council elections =

Island council elections were held in the Netherlands Antilles in 1967. They were the fifth elections for the Island Council.

== Aruba ==
Two parties already present in the Council retained representation in the Island Council: the Aruban People's Party (AVP) and the Aruban Patriotic Party (PPA). In addition, the Aruba National Union (UNA) formed a combined list with the Independent Aruban Party (PIA) and Revolutionary Workers' Party (PRO) under the abbreviation UNA-P.P.

Party	Votes	%	Seats	+/–
Aruban Patriotic Party	11,965	50.16	10	–3
Aruban People's Party	8,409	35.25	8	+2
UNA–PIA–PRO	3,479	14.59	3	+1
Total	23,853	100.00	21	0

== Bonaire ==
Party	Votes	%	Seats
Bonaire Democratic Party	2,130	65.64	6
United Progressive Bonairean Party	722	22.25	2
Bonairean Workers' Party	393	12.11	1
Total	3,245	100.00	9

== Curaçao ==
Party	Votes	%	Seats
Democratic Party	30,037	57.91	13
NVP-COP-PRP	15,242	29.39	6
URA	6,585	12.70	2
Total	51,864	100.00	21

== Windward Islands ==
The Windward Islands general elections, which were scheduled for 1967 to elect the 15 members of the Island Council, never took place because only the incumbent Democratic Party postulated a list, winning all seats.
