= 1959 Netherlands Antilles island council elections =

Island council elections were held in the Netherlands Antilles in 1959. They were the third elections for the Island Council.

== Aruba ==
Four parties participated, three of which had participated in 1955: the Aruban Patriotic Party (PPA), Aruban People's Party and the Aruba National Union. The Christian Democratic Party, a breakaway from the PPA, also contested the elections and won a single seat.

=== Results ===
Party	Votes	%	Seats	+/–
Aruban Patriotic Party	9,893	57.17	12	–3
Aruban People's Party	4,899	28.31	6	+3
Aruba National Union	1,609	9.30	2	–1
Christian Democratic Party	905	5.23	1	New
Total	17,306	100.00	21	0
Valid votes	17,306	98.70		
Invalid/blank votes	228	1.30		
Total votes	17,534	100.00		
Registered voters/turnout	19,084	91.88		
Source: Hartog

== Sint Maarten ==
General elections were held in Sint Maarten on 25 May 1959. The result was a victory for the Democratic Party, which won four of the five Island Council seats.

=== Results ===
Party	Votes	%	Seats	+/–
Democratic Party	392	63.84	4	0
National People's Party	149	24.27	1	0
Windward Islands People's Party	69	11.24	0	New
C. Hassell-Wilson	4	0.65	0	New
Total	614	100.00	5	0
Source: Lynch & Lynch
