= National People's Party (Curaçao) =

National People's Party Papiamento: Partido Nashonal di Pueblo Dutch: Nationale Volkspartij
- Leader: Ruthmilda Larmonie-Cecilia
- Founded: 19 April 1948
- Split from: Curaçaose Catholic Party
- Ideology: Christian democracy
- Political position: Centre to centre-right
- Regional affiliation: Christian Democrat Organization of America
- International affiliation: Centrist Democrat International
- Colours: Green
- Estates of Curaçao: 4 / 21

Website
- PNP Kòrsou

The National People's Party (PNP, Papiamento: Partido Nashonal di Pueblo; Dutch: Nationale Volkspartij) is a Christian democratic political party in Curaçao established in 1948. The party participated in island council elections of the territory Curaçao as well as the Curaçao-constituency of the Estates of the Netherlands Antilles until the dissolution of the Netherlands Antilles in 2010.

The party then held seats in the first, second and third Estates of Curaçao, but lost that seat in the 2017 elections. They would obtain their best ever result in the next elections in 2021 for the fifth Estates, winning four seats and over 12% of the votes case.

== Netherlands Antilles ==
The party was founded in 1948 by Moises Frumencio da Costa Gomez, the first Prime Minister of the Netherlands Antilles. Five other minister presidents of the country were affiliated with the PNP. At the legislative elections in the Netherlands Antilles in 2002, 2006 and 2010 respectively, the party won three, two and one of the 14 Curaçao-seats in the 22 seat Estates of the Netherlands Antilles.

In the island council of the island territory Curaçao in 2003 and 2007, the party won two seats. In the last island council the party obtained one of the 21 seats. The island council continued as Estates of Curaçao upon the dissolution of the Netherlands Antilles in October 2010.

== Election results ==
Election	Leader	Seats	+/–	Votes	%	Position	Government
1951	Moises Frumencio da Costa Gomez	9 / 21					
1955	Moises Frumencio da Costa Gomez	9 / 21					
1959	Moises Frumencio da Costa Gomez	10 / 21					
1963	Moises Frumencio da Costa Gomez	12 / 21					
1967	Juancho Evertsz	6 / 21					
1971	Juancho Evertsz	7 / 21					
1975	Juancho Evertsz	6 / 21					
1979		5 / 21					
1983		7 / 21					
1987	Maria Liberia-Peters	8 / 21	▲1	26,090	36.64	1st	
1991		10 / 21	▲2	33,164	47.02	1st	
1995		4 / 21	▼6	11,906	16.92	3rd	Opposition
1999		5 / 21	▲1	15,616	22.13	2nd	
2003		2 / 21	▼3	7,153	10.65	4th	
2007	Ersilia de Lannooy	2 / 21	Steady	7,558	10.15	4th	
2010	Humphrey Davelaar	1 / 21	▼1	4,588	6.2	6th	Opposition
2012	Humphrey Davelaar	1 / 21	Steady	5,130	5.9	6th	Coalition
2016	Humphrey Davelaar	2 / 21	▲1	7,017	8.9	5th	Coalition
2017	Humphrey Davelaar	0 / 21	▼0	3,099	3.9	9th	Extra-parliamentary
2021	Ruthmilda Larmonie-Cecilia	4 / 21	▲4	10,563	12.5	3rd	Coalition
2025	Ruthmilda Larmonie-Cecilia	4 / 21	▲0	12,297	16.31	2nd	Opposition
