= Crassispira flavocincta =

Scientific classification
- Kingdom: Animalia
- Phylum: Mollusca
- Class: Gastropoda
- Subclass: Caenogastropoda
- Order: Neogastropoda
- Superfamily: Conoidea
- Family: Pseudomelatomidae
- Genus: Crassispira
- Species: C. flavocincta

Binomial name
- Crassispira flavocincta (C. B. Adams, 1850)

Synonyms
- Pleurotoma flavocincta C. B. Adams, 1850)

Species of gastropod

Crassispira flavocincta is a species of sea snail, a marine gastropod mollusk in the family Pseudomelatomidae.

== Description ==
The length of the shell attains 6.6 mm, its diameter is 2.6 mm.

== Distribution ==
This marine species occurs in the Caribbean Sea off Jamaica, the ABC Islands, and Panama.
