= Concordia Political Alliance =

- Leader: Jeffry Richardson
- Founded: 15 August 2010; 14 years ago
- Colours: Gold

The Concordia Political Alliance (CPA) is a political party in Sint Maarten founded in 2010 by Jeffry Richardson, a one-time executive assistant to former Democratic Party commissioners Roy Marlin and Louie Laveist. At the last general elections before the dissolution of the Netherlands Antilles, 17 September 2010, the party won 1.0% of the popular vote and none of the 15 possible seats.
