= WIPM =

WIPM may refer to:

- Windward Islands People's Movement, a political party in the Caribbean Netherlands
- WIPM-TV, a public television station in Mayagüez, Puerto Rico
