= 1963 Netherlands Antilles island council elections =

Island council elections were held in the Netherlands Antilles in 1963. They were the fourth elections for the Island Council.

== Aruba ==
Three parties already present in the Council retained representation: the Aruban Patriotic Party, Aruban People's Party and Aruba National Union.

=== Results ===
| Party | Votes | % | Seats | +/– |
|---|---|---|---|---|
| Aruban Patriotic Party | 11,662 | 60.33 | 13 | +1 |
| Aruban People's Party | 5,668 | 29.32 | 6 | 0 |
| Aruba National Union | 2,001 | 10.35 | 2 | 0 |
| Total | 19,331 | 100.00 | 21 | 0 |
Source: Official Newsletter, Historia di Aruba

== Sint Maarten ==
General elections were held in Sint Maarten on 31 May 1963 to elect the 5 members of the Island Council. The result was a victory for the Democratic Party, which won four of the five Island Council seats.

=== Results ===
| Party | Votes | % | Seats | +/– |
|---|---|---|---|---|
| Democratic Party | 614 | 71.73 | 4 | 0 |
| National People's Party | 143 | 16.71 | 1 | 0 |
| Windward Islands People's Party | 99 | 11.57 | 0 | 0 |
| Total | 856 | 100.00 | 5 | 0 |
Source: Lynch & Lynch
