= 1987 Netherlands Antilles island council elections =

- 10 April 1987 (Leeward Antilles); 22 May 1987 (SSS islands)

All 49 seats in the island councils of Bonaire (9), Curaçao (21), Saba (5), Sint Eustatius (5) and Sint Maarten (9)

Island council elections were held in the Netherlands Antilles on 10 April (Bonaire and Curaçao) and 22 May 1987 (SSS islands) to elect the members of the island councils of its five island territories. The election was won by the Bonaire Patriotic Union–Bonaire Workers' Party list (5 seats) in Bonaire, the National People's Party (8 seats) in Curaçao, the Saba Democratic Labour Movement (3 seats) in Saba, the Democratic Party Statia (3 seats) in Sint Eustatius, and the Democratic Party (7 seats) in Sint Maarten.

== Results ==
=== Bonaire ===
Party	Votes	%	Seats
Bonaire Patriotic Union–Bonaire Workers' Party	2,994	54.81	5
Bonaire Democratic Party	2,190	40.09	4
New Action Party	279	5.11	0
Total	5,463	100.00	9
Source: Statistical Yearbook of the Netherlands Antilles

=== Curaçao ===
Party	Votes	%	Seats	+/–
National People's Party	26,090	36.64	8	+1
New Antilles Movement	18,141	25.48	6	–2
Democratic Party	13,879	19.49	4	–1
Soshal Independiente	6,953	9.76	2	New
Workers' Liberation Front	5,386	7.56	1	0
Nos Pais	761	1.07	0	New
Total	71,210	100.00	21	0
Registered voters/turnout	111,408	–		
Source: Statistical Yearbook of the Netherlands Antilles

=== Saba ===
Party	Votes	%	Seats	+/–
Saba Democratic Labour Movement	328	51.01	3	New
Windward Islands People's Movement	266	41.37	2	–2
Saba True Labour Party	49	7.62	0	New
Total	643	100.00	5	0
Source: Statistical Yearbook of the Netherlands Antilles

=== Sint Eustatius ===
Party	Votes	%	Seats	+/–
Democratic Party	445	52.91	3	0
Windward Islands People's Movement	311	36.98	2	0
SRP	85	10.11	0	–
Total	841	100.00	5	0
Source: Statistical Yearbook of the Netherlands Antilles

=== Sint Maarten ===
Party	Votes	%	Seats	+/–
Democratic Party	5,036	74.19	7	+2
Sint Maarten Patriotic Alliance–Independent Citizens Movement	1,752	25.81	2	New
Total	6,788	100.00	9	+2
Valid votes	6,788	98.62		
Invalid/blank votes	95	1.38		
Total votes	6,883	100.00		
Registered voters/turnout	6,883	100.00		
Source: Statistical Yearbook of the Netherlands Antilles, Amigoe, Lynch & Lynch
