= Claude Wathey =

Sint Maartener politician

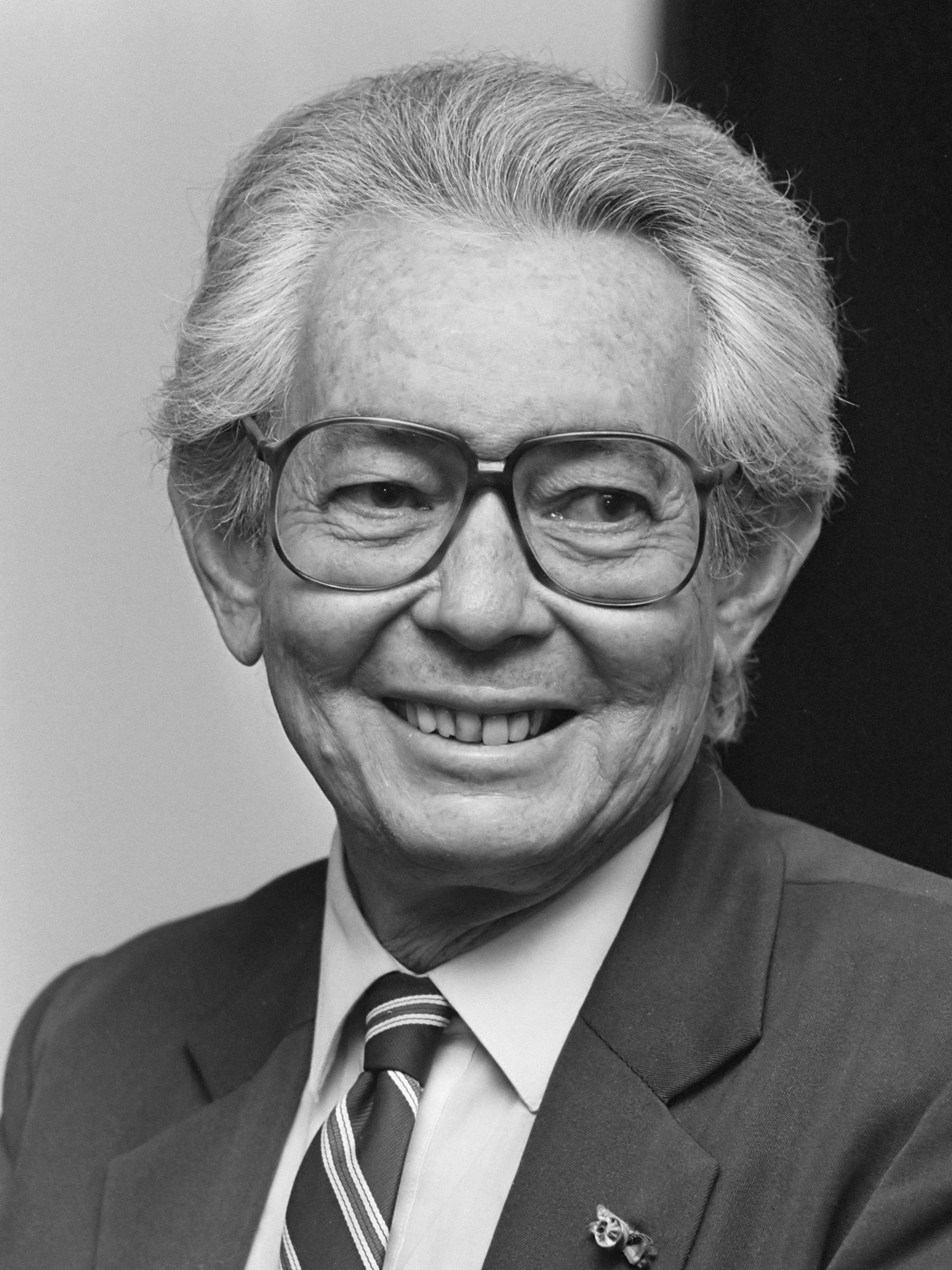
- Claude Wathey (1984)

Leader of the Democratic Party Sint Maarten
- In office 1954–1994
- Succeeded by: Sarah Wescot-Williams

Member of the Netherlands Antilles Parliament for Windward Islands
- In office: 1962–1990; 1991–1992

Personal details
- Born: 24 July 1926 Sint Maarten, Curaçao and Dependencies
- Died: 8 or 9 January 1998 (aged 71) Philipsburg, Sint Maarten
- Party: Democratic Party Sint Maarten

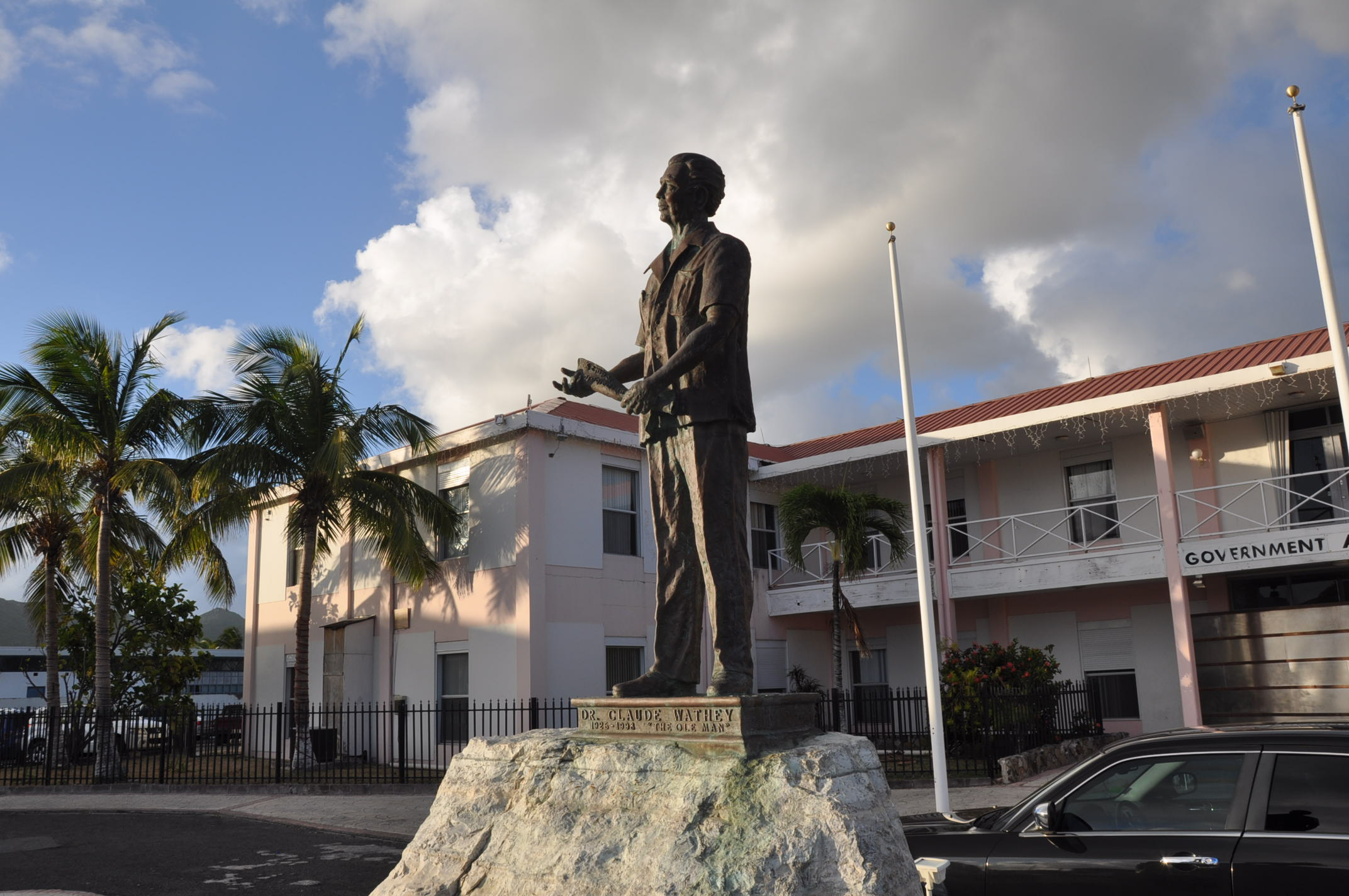
Statue of Claude Wathey in Philipsburg

Albert Claudius "Claude" Wathey (24 July 1926 – 8 or 9 January 1998) was a prominent politician of the Democratic Party from the island of Sint Maarten. He was knighted by the Dutch Crown for his political longevity.

Wathey championed political independence for the island in 1989, but was later convicted on charges of perjury; however, many on Sint Maarten felt the trial was nothing more than a witch hunt conducted by his rivals and adversaries in Curaçao and the Netherlands in order to break his monopoly on political power in Sint Maarten and to destroy his credibility. Despite this, he remains a popular figure, even after his death.

== Biography ==
The Wathey family is an old Caribbean family of Belgian origin, from the city of Tongeren. With the proclamation of the Islands Regulation of the Netherlands Antilles in 1951, the Dutch islands obtained greater political autonomy, in the wake of worldwide de-colonization. Three years later, the Charter for the Kingdom of the Netherlands was proclaimed, giving full autonomy to the federation of the six islands as a constituent country of the Kingdom of the Netherlands.

Claude (as he was known) was elected to the Parliament of the Netherlands Antilles in 1962, representing the three Dutch Windward Islands of Saba, Statia, and Sint Maarten. Under his administration, Sint Maarten was transformed from a neglected colonial backwater into a thriving tourism destination with one of the highest per capita incomes in the region. He won every election until 1990, and made a comeback in 1991 after a brief setback.

After declaring that he was a "proud Caribbean man", he resigned from office in 1992 in protest against Dutch "higher supervision", a form of oversight and financial control imposed by the Dutch government to ensure "good governance", after allegations of the island's first coalition government fell and Wathey's main rivals found themselves in opposition again. In 1994 Wathey was charged with corruption, fraud, and being part of a "criminal" organization; however, he was never sentenced or convicted on any of the latter, but received a one-year prison sentence for perjury. In the duration of his trial Claude Wathey claimed serious health troubles hindered him from appearing in court which delayed the painstaking trial. Claude spent his remaining days on Sint Maarten and died in January 1998.
