= August 2024 Sint Maarten general election =

- 19 August 2024
- All 15 seats in Parliament; 8 seats needed for a majority
- Turnout: 61.04% (▼4.47pp)
Party	Leader	Vote %	Seats	+/–
NA	Silveria Jacobs	16.52	3	−1
URSM	Luc Mercelina	16.24	3	+1
DP	Sarah Wescot-Williams	15.12	3	+1
UPP	Omar Ottley	14.92	2	−1
PFP	Melissa Gumbs	14.21	2	0
SAM	Franklin Meyers	9.13	1	New
NOW	Christophe Emmanuel	9.08	1	−1
This lists parties that won seats. See the complete results below.
Prime Minister before	Prime Minister after
Luc Mercelina; USRM	Luc Mercelina; USRM

Snap general elections were held in Sint Maarten on 19 August 2024, following the early dissolution of the parliament elected in January.

== Background ==
Following the January 2024 general elections a four-party government was formed by the Unified Resilient St. Maarten Movement (URSM), the Democratic Party, the Party for Progress and Nation Opportunity Wealth (NOW), all of which had won two seats. As the URSM received the most votes of the four, its leader Luc Mercelina became prime minister. Elected members took office on 10 February 2024, and Mercelina took the oath of office on 3 May. However, the government collapsed 18 days later when NOW MP Kevin Maingrette resigned from his party and left the coalition to join the opposition. This crossing the floor cost the coalition its majority, leading Mercelina to dissolve parliament and call snap elections. However, on 27 May, Maingrette withdrew his support for the opposition and expressed support for the Mercelina administration again despite still sitting as an independent. However, the elections remained scheduled. On 2 July, Maingrette announced he would not seek re-election, and on 12 July was arrested and his house scheduled to be searched following possible involvement in bribery prior to his time as an MP.

== Electoral system ==
Per the Constitution of Sint Maarten, the number of members in the Estates is determined by the following scale, dependent on the population:

- population ≤60,000: 15 seats
- population 60,001 to 70,000: 17 seats
- population 70,001 to 80,000: 19 seats
- population 80,001+: 21 seats

As the population was estimated to be 41,349 as of 1 January 2024, the number of mandates to be contested in this election is 15. The members are elected by open list proportional representation (first using the Hare quota then D'Hondt method for any seats still unallocated) for a four-year term. The voting age is 18, and candidates standing must be a resident of the island, a Dutch national, 18 years of age or older, and must not have been disqualified from voting. Elected members may not stay outside the country for more than eight months, or their mandate lapses, and must not be the spouse or a second-degree relative of another member. In order to participate in the election, new parties and parties without a seat in parliament are required to obtain at least 144 signatures; 1% of the valid votes of the prior elections (in this case the January 2024 general elections).

== Results ==
Party	Votes	%	Seats	+/–
National Alliance	2,262	16.52	3	–1
Unified Resilient St. Maarten Movement	2,224	16.24	3	+1
Democratic Party	2,071	15.12	3	+1
United People's Party	2,043	14.92	2	–1
Party for Progress	1,946	14.21	2	0
Soualiga Action Movement	1,250	9.13	1	New
Nation Opportunity Wealth	1,243	9.08	1	–1
Oualichi Movement for Change	521	3.80	0	New
Empire Culture Empowerment Association	136	0.99	0	0
Total	13,696	100.00	15	0
Valid votes	13,696	98.63		
Invalid/blank votes	190	1.37		
Total votes	13,886	100.00		
Registered voters/turnout	22,750	61.04		
Source: Government of Sint Maarten

== Aftermath ==
Theoretically, the original coalition formed following the election in January between the URSM, DP, PFP, and NOW would still have enough seats for a majority (obtaining 9 in total, an increase of 1 over the previous election) if they wished to continue under the prior agreement. However, on 22 August, it was announced that the URSM, DP, PFP, and SAM had agreed to form a governing coalition, with Mercelina likely returning as prime minister.

On 6 September, Governor Ajamu Baly appointed Mercelina as formateur. On 6 November, Mercelina announced a 7-member cabinet, with 2 ministerial positions each for URSM, DP, and PFP and 1 position for SAM. The second Mercelina cabinet included four returning ministers from the previous cabinet and three newcomers. The new cabinet was sworn in on 26 November.
