= 2014 Sint Maarten general election =

- 29 August 2014
- All 15 seats in Parliament; 8 seats needed for a majority
- Turnout: 69.16% (▼2.31pp)
Party	Leader	Vote %	Seats	+/–
UPP	Theo Heyliger	42.67	7	+1
NA	William Marlin	27.86	4	−3
DP	Sarah Wescott-Williams	16.09	2	0
USP	Frans Richardson	11.31	2	New
This lists parties that won seats. See the complete results below.
Prime Minister before	Prime Minister after
Sarah Wescott-Williams; DP	Marcel Gumbs; UPP

General elections were held in Sint Maarten on 29 August 2014. They were the first elections since Sint Maarten became a constituent country within the Kingdom of the Netherlands in 2010, at which point the Island Council became the Estates. The result was a victory for the United People's Party, which won seven of the 15 seats in the Estates.

== Electoral system ==
The 15 seats in the Estates were elected by proportional representation. In order to participate in the election, a party was required to obtain at least 138 signatures; 1% of the valid votes of the 2010 Island Council elections.

== Campaign ==
Five parties secured the required number of signatures to contest the elections; the Democratic Party Sint Maarten (DP), the National Alliance (NA), the One St. Maarten People Party (OSPP), the United People's Party (UP) and the United St. Maarten Party (US). The DP, NA, UP and US were easily able to get the necessary signatures, whilst the OSPP only narrowly qualified.

The Social Reform Party led by Jacinto Mock, a former National Alliance candidate, obtained fewer than 80 signatures, and was initially declared unable to run. However, it did ultimately contest the elections.

== Results ==
Party	Votes	%	Seats	+/–
United People's Party	6,211	42.67	7	+1
National Alliance	4,055	27.86	4	–3
Democratic Party	2,342	16.09	2	0
United St. Maarten Party	1,647	11.31	2	New
One St. Maarten People Party	169	1.16	0	New
Social Reform Party	132	0.91	0	New
Total	14,556	100.00	15	0
Valid votes	14,556	98.17		
Invalid votes	191	1.29		
Blank votes	80	0.54		
Total votes	14,827	100.00		
Registered voters/turnout	21,439	69.16		
Source: Government of Sint Maarten
