= Partido MAN =

MAN-PIN Party Partido MAN
- Leader: Giselle McWilliam
- Founder: Don Martina
- Founded: 6 February 1971
- Ideology: Social democracy
- Political position: Centre-left
- Colours: Blue
- Estates of Curaçao: 2 / 21

Website
- http://www.partidoman.org/

Partido MAN is a political party in Curaçao founded in 1971, which has two of the 21 seats of the Estates of Curaçao after the Curaçao general election of 2021. In the elections preceding the dissolution of the Netherlands Antilles the party gained two seats as well and joined the coalition government.

== Name ==
MAN originally stood for Movementu Antia Nobo (English: New Antilles Movement), but a party congress in 2005 decided to drop that meaning and let MAN be the name of the party in itself.

== Netherlands Antilles ==
Don Martina, minister-president of the Netherlands Antilles from 1979 until 1984 and from 1986 to 1988, was MAN-related.

At the legislative elections in the Netherlands Antilles, 18 January 2002, the party won 5.2% of the popular vote and no seats, at the Netherlands Antilles general election of 2006, the party returned in the Estates of the Netherlands Antilles with 3 out of 14 seats of the Curaçao constituency in the 22 seat parliament. In the last Netherlands Antilles general election in 2010, the party participated together with NPA and FK obtaining 5 seats.

In the island council (Netherlands Antilles) of 2003 and 2007, the party obtained 2 and 5 seats respectively. The two seats the party obtained in the 2010 island council elections continued as the Estates of Curaçao on 10 October 2010.

== Election results ==
Election	Leader	Seats	+/–	Votes	%	Position	Government
1971		1 / 21					
1979		6 / 21					
1983		8 / 21					
1987		6 / 21					
1991		3 / 21					
1995		6 / 21					
1999		2 / 21					
2003	Charles Cooper	2 / 21	Steady	6,274	9.34		
2007	Charles Cooper	5 / 21	▲3	13,923	18.7		
2010	Eunice Eisden	2 / 21	▼3	6.531	8.8	▼4th	Coalition
2012	Charles Cooper	2 / 21	Steady	8,294	9.5	▼5th	Opposition
2016	Hensley Koeiman	4 / 21	▲2	12,839	16.23	▲1st	Coalition
2017	Hensley Koeiman	5 / 21	▲1	16,070	20.4	▼2nd	Coalition
2021	Steven Martina	2 / 21	▼3	5,456	6.43	▼4th	Opposition
2025 (Note: Run in a joint list with Partido Inovashon Nashonal.)	Giselle McWilliam	2 / 21	0	6,378	8.46	4th	Opposition
