= Social Reform Party =

- Leader: Jacinto Mock
- President: Jacinto Mock
- Founded: 2013; 12 years ago
- Colours: Blue
- Parliament of Sint Maarten: 0 / 15

The Social Reform Party is a political party in Sint Maarten founded in 2013 by former National Alliance member Jacinto Mock. At the 2014 general elections on 29 August, it obtained 0.91% of the votes and failed to obtain a seat in parliament.
