= Luc Mercelina =

Sint Maarten surgeon and politician (born 1964)

His Excellency Luc Mercelina
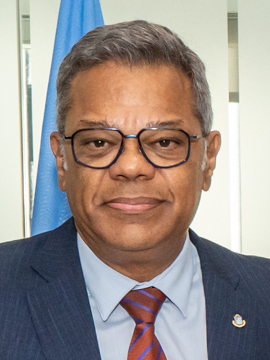
- Marcelina in 2024

8th Prime Minister of Sint Maarten
- Incumbent
- Assumed office 3 May 2024
- Monarch: Willem-Alexander
- Governor: Ajamu Baly
- Deputy: Veronica Jansen-Webster
- Preceded by: Silveria Jacobs

Leader of the Unified Resilient St. Maarten Movement
- Incumbent
- Assumed office 10 October 2021
- Preceded by: Position established

Personal details
- Born: 6 December 1964 (age 61) Curaçao, Netherlands Antilles
- Party: United Democrats (until 2019); United People's Party (2019–2021); Unified Resilient St. Maarten Movement (since 2021)
- Education: Maastricht University

Luc F. E. Mercelina (born 6 December 1964) is a surgeon and politician from Sint Maarten and the current prime minister as of 3 May 2024. He is the founder and leader of the Unified Resilient St. Maarten Movement (URSM). He was also a member of the United Democrats (UD) and the United People's Party (UP).

== Early life and career ==
Luc Mercelina was born in Curaçao as the second child of Milo Mercelina, of Bonairean descent, and Juliette S.F. Fleming of Marigot, Saint Martin. He graduated as a doctor in 1990 from the Medical University of Maastricht. His professional career started in Curaçao, where he was a general practitioner in Santa Rosa from 1990 to 1992. He further specialized in surgery at the UZ Leuven in Belgium, which he completed in 1998. After working as a surgeon in the Netherlands for a year, he moved to Sint Maarten in 1999, where he worked for 10 years at the Sint Maarten Medical Center (SMMC).

== Political career ==
In the 2018 elections, the United Democrats became the largest party in the Estates of Sint Maarten with 7 seats, with Mercelina holding one of them. On 9 September 2019, Mercelina left the UD, leading to the collapse of the second Marlin-Romeo cabinet. He then became a member of the United People's Party for two years, before leaving and founding the Unified Resilient Sint Maarten Movement on 10 October 2021. The URSM contested the January 2024 general election winning 2 seats, and later entered a coalition agreement with the Democratic Party, Party for Progress, and Nation Opportunity Wealth that designated Mercelina as the new Prime Minister.
