= People's Crusade Labour Party =

People's Crusade Labour Party Partido Laboral Krusada Popular
- Leader: Errol Goeloe
- Founded: May 1, 1997
- Ideology: Social democracy Labourism
- Political position: Centre-left
- Regional affiliation: COPPPAL (Observer)
- Colours: Red (2012 election); Pink
- Estates of Curaçao: 0

Website
- plkp.an

The People's Crusade Labour Party (Dutch: Partij van de Arbeid en de Volksstrijd; Papiamento: Partido Laboral Krusada Popular, PLKP), sometimes referred to as simply Laboral, was a political party in Curaçao founded in 1997. It was known as the party of the labour unions.

By obtaining 1019 registrations of support, the party qualified (a minimum of 743 was required) for participation in the Curaçao General Election of 2012 on 19 October in a combined list with the Democratic Party (DP), named Partido Democrat Laboral (Democratic Labour Party). The group obtained 1.2% of the votes which was insufficient for a seat.

== Netherlands Antilles ==
The party was founded as the labour unions wanted to have a say in politics of Curaçao. At the legislative elections in the Netherlands Antilles, 18 January 2002, the party won 12.1% of the popular vote of Curaçao and 2 out of 22 seats in the Estates of the Netherlands Antilles. At the elections of 27 January 2006, the party lost parliamentary representation in the Netherlands Antilles.

Netherlands Antilles general elections					
Year	Leader	Seats	+/– seats	Votes	
1998	Errol Cova	3 / 14	▲3		
2002	Errol Cova	2 / 14	▼1	9,695	14.44
2006	Errol Cova	0 / 14	▼2	4,293	6.09
2010		0 / 14	Did not contest		

Curaçao island council elections
Year	Leader	Seats	+/– seats	Votes	%
1999	Errol Cova	4 / 21	▲4		
2003	Errol Cova	3 / 21	▼1	8,785	13.08
2007	Errol Cova	0 / 21	▼3	1,227	1.65
2010	Errol Goeloe	0 / 21		509	0.68
2012	Errol Goeloe	0 / 21			
2016		0 / 21	n/a	Did not contest	
