= Dutch Caribbean =

Caribbean territories of the Kingdom of the Netherlands

- Flag of the Kingdom of the Netherlands

- Location of the Dutch Caribbean islands Aruba Curaçao Sint Maarten Caribbean Netherlands (from west to east): Bonaire; Saba; Sint Eustatius
- Area: 980 km^{2} (380 sq mi)
- Population (as of January 2019): 337,617
- GDP (Nominal): US$8.911 billion
- GDP per Capita (Nominal): US$29,240
- Density: 343/km^{2} (890/sq mi)
- Languages: Dutch, English, Papiamento
- Government: 3 constituent countries 3 special municipalities

The Dutch Caribbean (Note: Dutch: Caribisch deel van het Koninkrijk der Nederlanden, lit. 'Caribbean part of the Kingdom of the Netherlands'; colloquially de CAS- en BES-eilanden, 'the CAS and BES islands'.) are the New World territories, colonies, and countries (former and current) of the Dutch colonial empire and the Kingdom of the Netherlands located in the Caribbean Sea, mainly the northern and southwestern regions of the Lesser Antilles archipelago.

The Dutch Caribbean comprises the constituent countries of Curaçao, Aruba and Sint Maarten (the 'CAS' islands) and the special municipalities of Bonaire, Sint Eustatius and Saba (BES islands). The term "Dutch Caribbean" is sometimes also used for the Caribbean Netherlands, an entity consisting of the three special municipalities forming part of the constituent country of the Netherlands since 2010. The population of the Dutch Caribbean is 337,617 as of January 2019.

== History ==
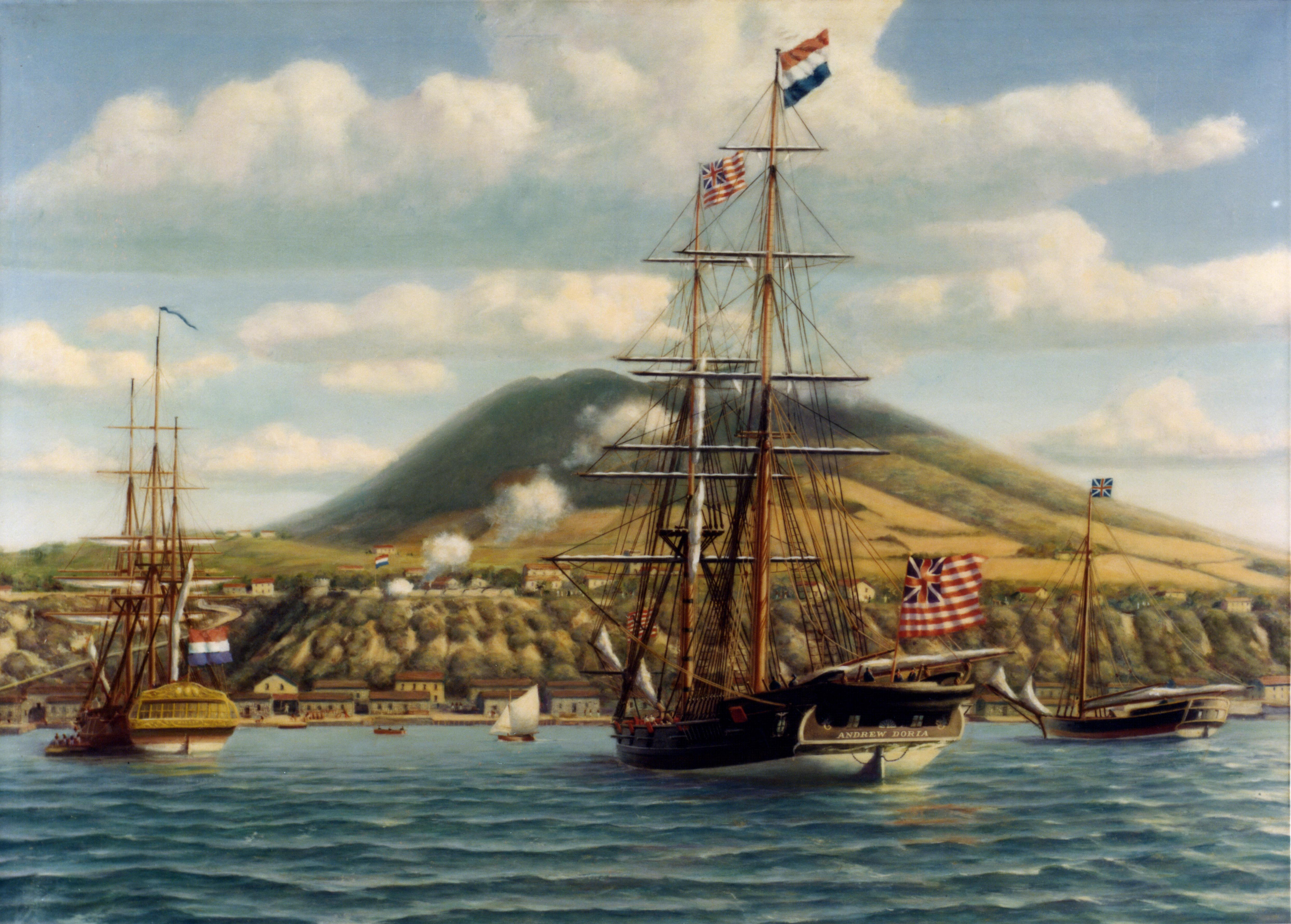
Andrew Doria receives a salute from the Dutch fort at Sint Eustatius, 16 November 1776. Painting by Phillips Melville (1895–1987).

The islands of the Dutch Caribbean were, formerly, part of Curaçao and Dependencies (1815–1828), or Sint Eustatius and Dependencies (1815–1828), which were merged with the colony of Suriname (not actually considered part of the "Dutch Caribbean", although it is located on the Caribbean coast of northeastern South America), collectively known as the Dutch West Indies. They were governed from Paramaribo, Suriname, until 1845, when all the islands again became part of Curaçao and Dependencies.

In 1954, the islands became the land (Dutch for "country") of Netherlands Antilles, lasting until 2010. The autonomy of the Netherlands Antilles' island territories was stipulated in the Islands Regulation of the Netherlands Antilles. Initially, the Netherlands Antilles consisted of four island territories—Aruba, Bonaire, Curaçao and the SSS islands. The latter split into the Island Territories of Saba, Sint Eustatius and Sint Maarten, in 1983.

The island of Aruba seceded from the Netherlands Antilles in 1986 to become a separate constituent country of the Kingdom of the Netherlands, leaving five island territories within the Netherlands Antilles. This arrangement lasted until the complete dissolution of the Netherlands Antilles, as a unified political entity, in 2010; that year, Curaçao and Sint Maarten became autonomous constituent countries within the Kingdom (like Aruba). Bonaire, Sint Eustatius and Saba became special municipalities of the Netherlands proper (located on the European mainland), a member state of the European Union.

== Geography ==
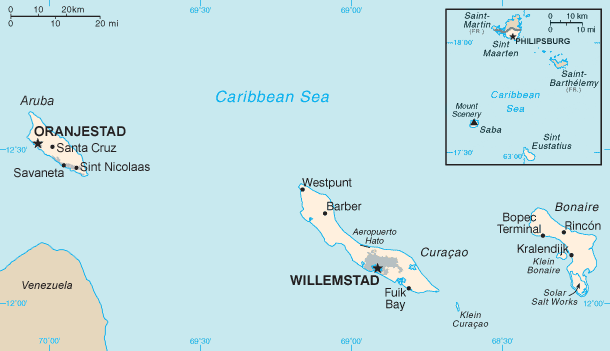
Map of the Dutch Caribbean islands

Within the Kingdom of the Netherlands, the Dutch Caribbean (the blue field in the diagram) comprises three constituent countries (middle row) and three special municipalities (bottom row)

Geographically, the six entities of the Dutch Caribbean are clustered into two vastly separated areas of the Caribbean:

- Three are at the far northern end of the Leeward Islands, thus, the far northern end of the Lesser Antilles. From north to south, these are Sint Maarten (occupying roughly the southern half of the island of Saint Martin), Saba, and Sint Eustatius.
- From west to east, Aruba, Curaçao and Bonaire are located just off of the Caribbean coastline of northern Venezuela, at the far western end of the Leeward Antilles (which extend west from the southern end of the Windward Islands—thus they are at the southwestern end of the Lesser Antilles).

Politically, each (six) entity of the Dutch Caribbean currently has one of two relationships with the Netherlands:

- Three have the status of being constituent countries of the Kingdom of the Netherlands.
- Three have the status of being special municipalities of the Netherlands alone, as distinct from the Kingdom in its entirety.

=== Constituent countries ===
Three Caribbean polities are landen (Dutch for "countries") within the Kingdom of the Netherlands: Aruba, Curaçao, and Sint Maarten. The Netherlands is the fourth and largest constituent country in the Kingdom.

Sint Maarten comprises the southern half of the island of Saint Martin. The northern half of the island (the Collectivity of Saint Martin) is an overseas territory of France. Aruba and Curaçao are located in the far south of the Caribbean, roughly 30 kilometres (19 mi) and 65 kilometres (40 mi) from the coast of Venezuela, respectively.

=== Special municipalities ===
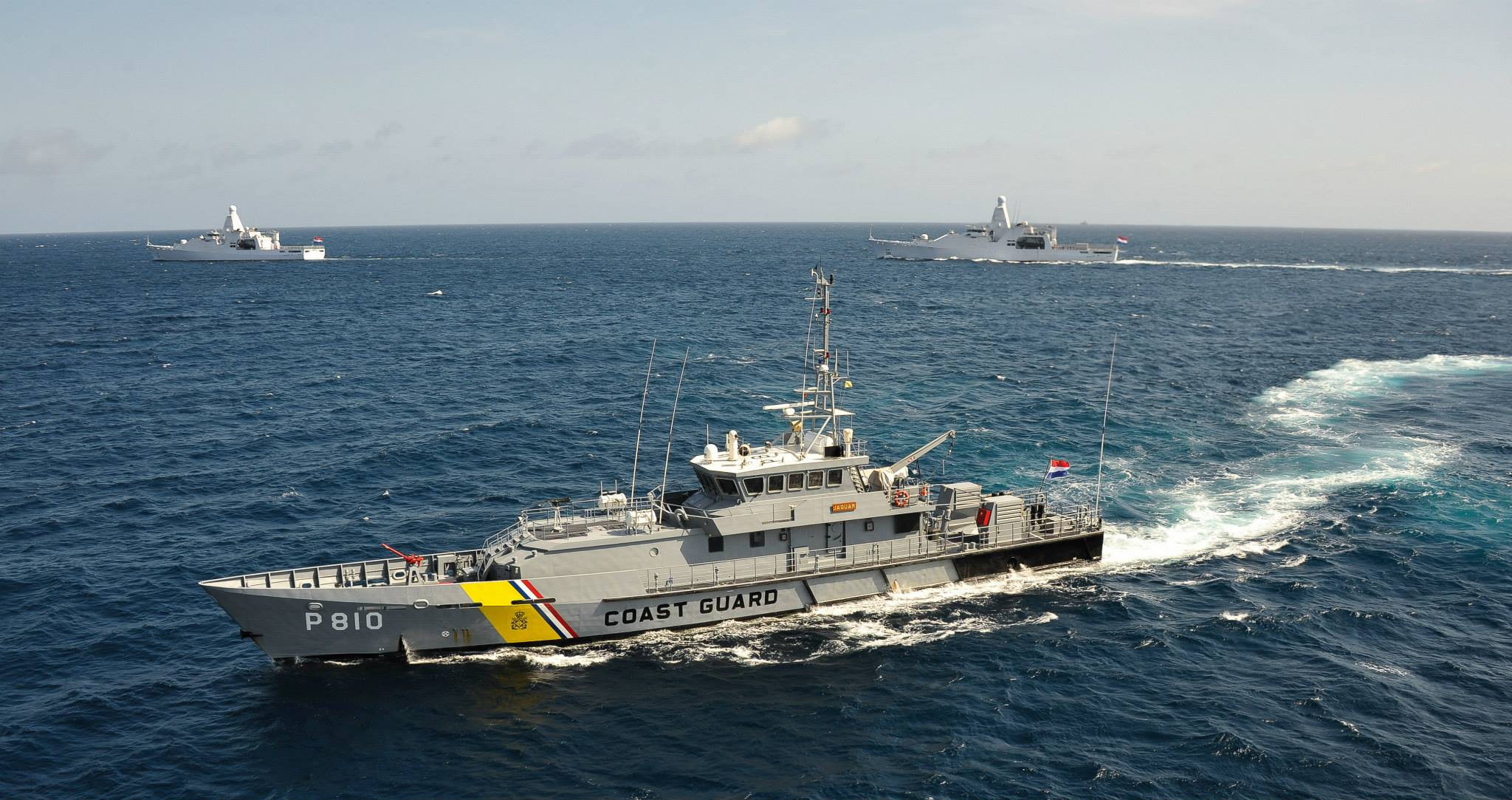
Dutch Caribbean Coast Guard cutter

The three Caribbean islands that are special municipalities of the Netherlands alone are Bonaire, Sint Eustatius, and Saba. Abbreviated collectively, these are also known as the "BES islands", or the Caribbean Netherlands. Bonaire is located in the far south of the Caribbean, being about 80 kilometres north of the coast of Venezuela; Saba is located about 50 kilometres south of Sint Maarten, and boasts the highest mountain in the Netherlands, Mount Scenery, at 880 m (2,887') above sea level). Sint Eustatius is located directly north of Saint Kitts.

== Dutch Caribbean islands ==
Flag	Coat of arms	Name	Island group	Constitutional status	Capital	Area	Population (January 2019)	Density
(Aruba)		Aruba	Leeward Antilles	Constituent country	Oranjestad	180 km^{2} (69 sq mi)	112,309	624/km^{2} (1,620/sq mi)
(Bonaire)		Bonaire	Leeward Antilles	Special municipality	Kralendijk	294 km^{2} (114 sq mi)	20,104	69/km^{2} (180/sq mi)
(Curaçao)		Curaçao	Leeward Antilles	Constituent country	Willemstad	444 km^{2} (171 sq mi)	158,665	358/km^{2} (930/sq mi)
(Saba (island))		Saba	Leeward Islands	Special municipality	The Bottom	13 km^{2} (5.0 sq mi)	1,915	148/km^{2} (380/sq mi)
(Sint Eustatius)		Sint Eustatius	Leeward Islands	Special municipality	Oranjestad	21 km^{2} (8.1 sq mi)	3,138	150/km^{2} (390/sq mi)
(Sint Maarten)		Sint Maarten	Leeward Islands	Constituent country	Philipsburg	34 km^{2} (13 sq mi)	41,486	1,221/km^{2} (3,160/sq mi)
Total						986 km^{2} (381 sq mi)	337,617	343/km^{2} (890/sq mi)

=== Photo gallery ===
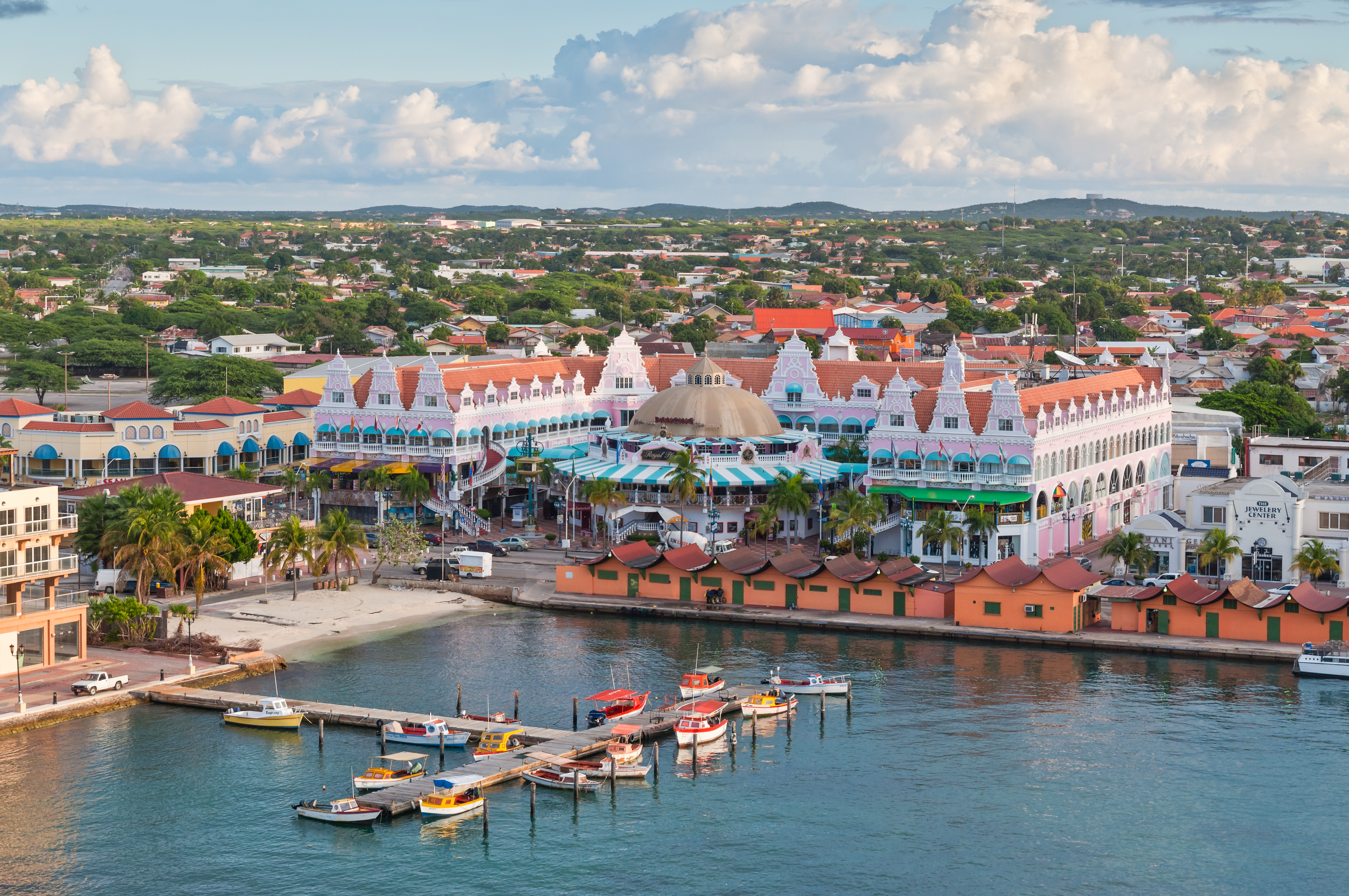
Oranjestad, Aruba

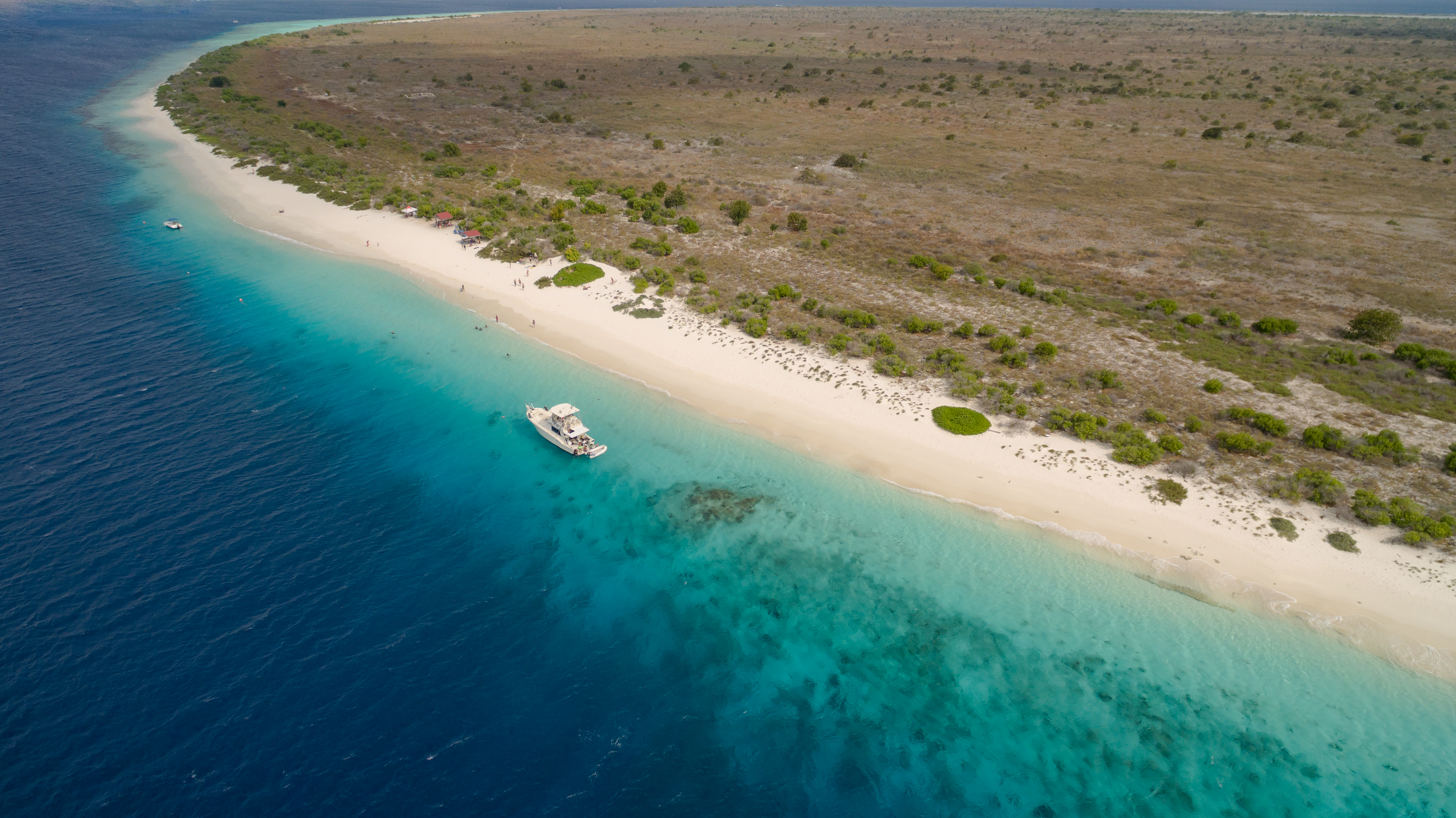
Bonaire

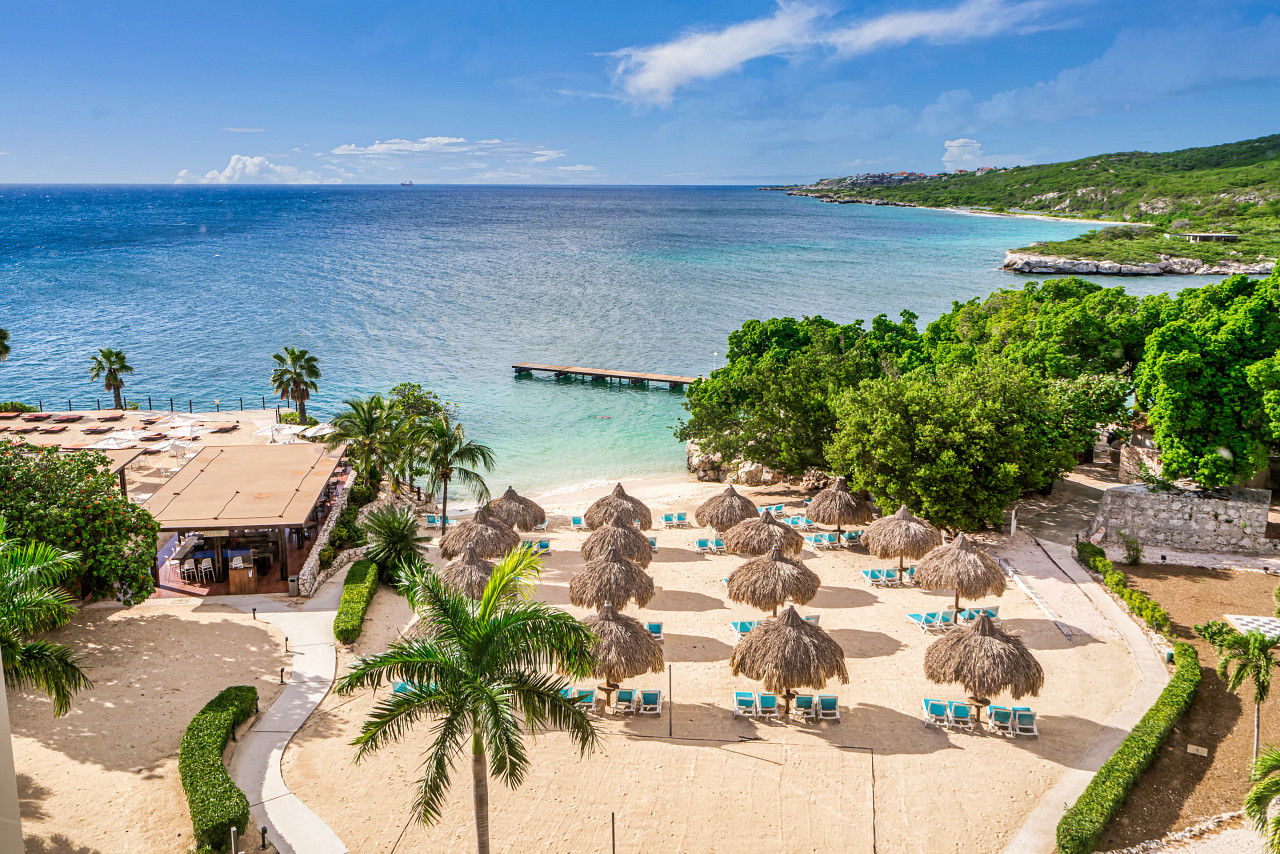
Curaçao

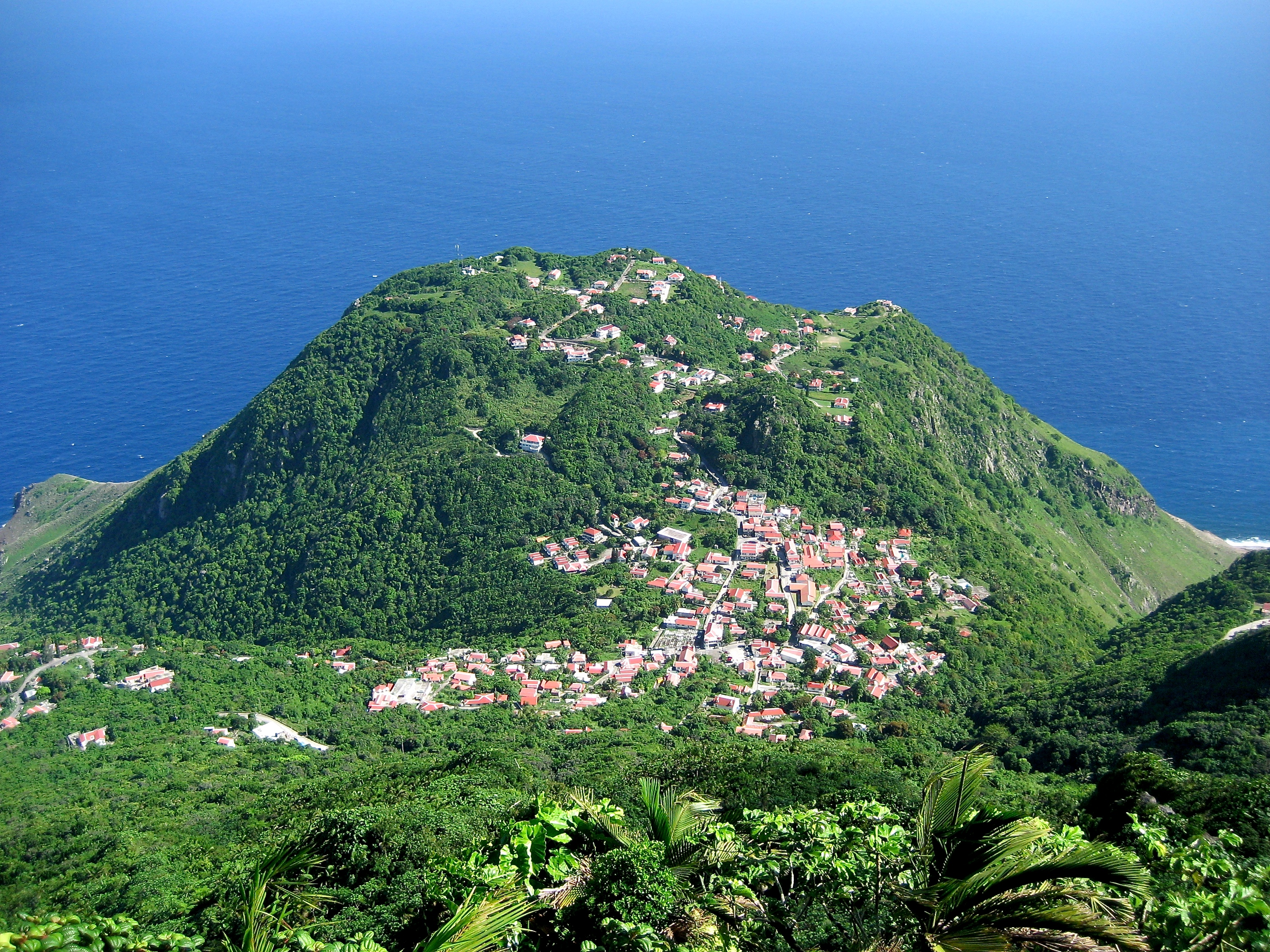
Saba

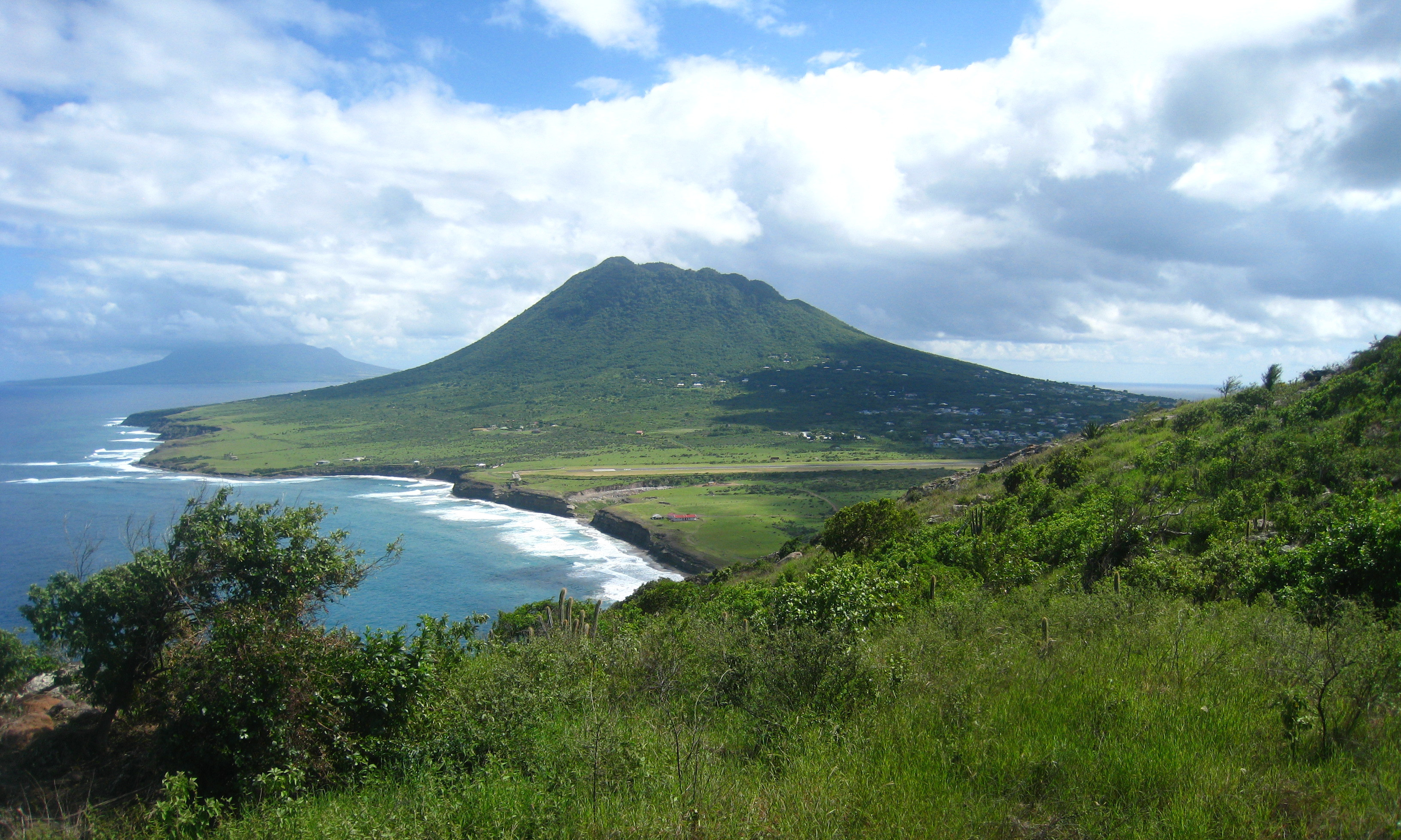
Sint Eustatius

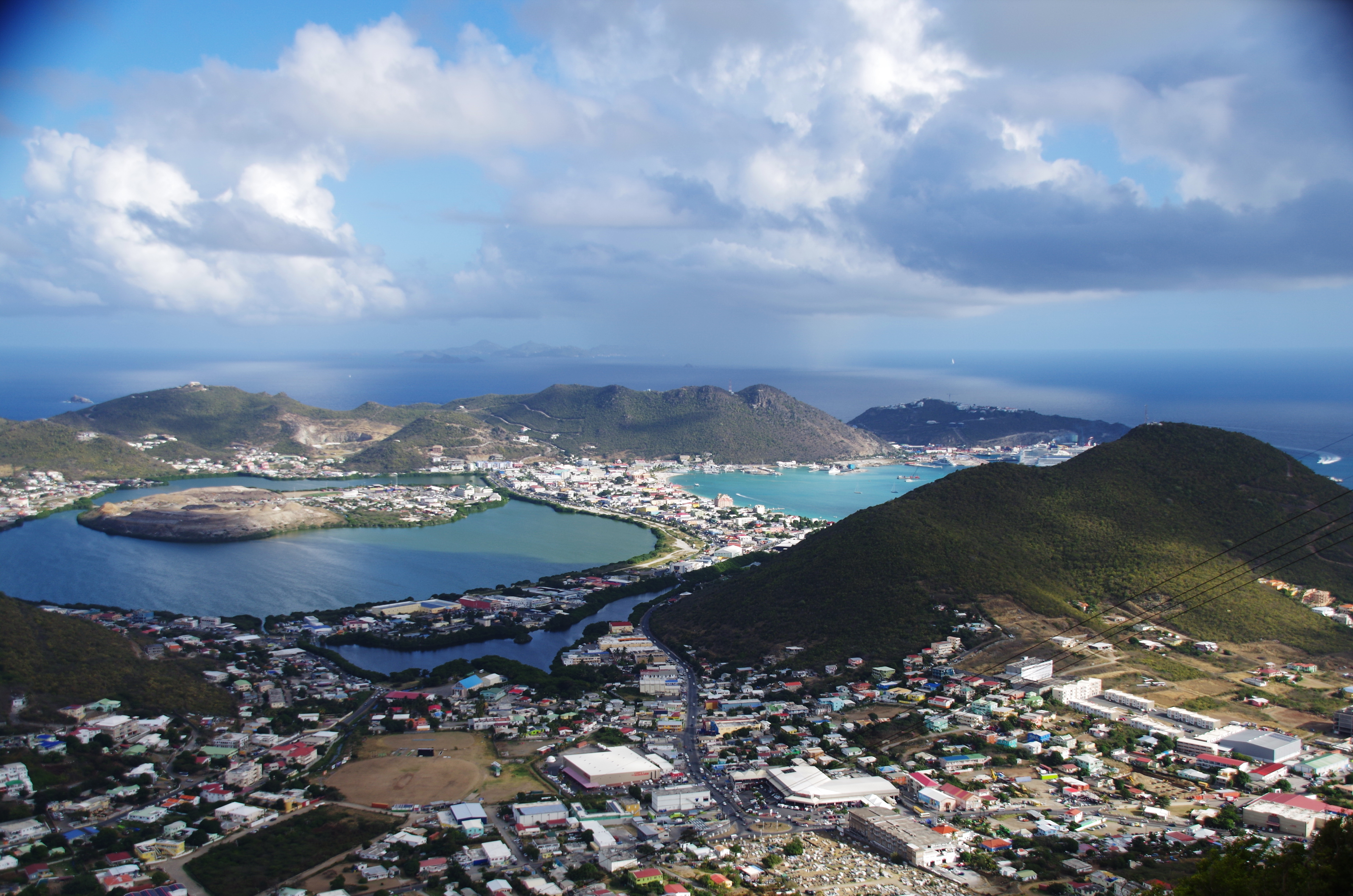
Sint Maarten

== Grouping of islands ==
The islands have also been informally grouped in the following ways.

- Geographically, by location in the Lesser Antilles (in alphabetical order):
  - ABC islands, for Aruba, Bonaire, and Curaçao (within the Leeward Antilles group)
  - SSS islands, for Saba, Sint Eustatius, and Sint Maarten (within the Leeward Islands group)
- Politically, by constitutional status (in order of population size):
  - CAS islands, for Curaçao, Aruba, and Sint Maarten (constituent countries of the Kingdom of the Netherlands)
  - BES islands, for Bonaire, Sint Eustatius, and Saba (special municipalities of the Netherlands)

== Demographics ==
=== Ethnic groups ===
The populations of the Dutch Caribbean descend from a diverse array of ethnic groups from Europe, Africa, South America and Asia. Aruba has more European and Amerindian ancestry on average, while the other islands, such as Curaçao, have more African ancestry on average.

The islands' populations have grown significantly in recent decades with a large percentage being foreign-born, mostly due to immigration to the islands from various countries and territories.

=== Languages ===
Inhabitants of the Dutch Caribbean are multilingual, speaking two to four (or more) languages, with varying, although often high, degrees of fluency.

Papiamento, a Portuguese-based creole with influences from Spanish, Dutch, West-African and Amerindian languages, is official and the predominant language on Aruba, Bonaire and Curaçao. There are two main dialects of the language, Papiamento (Aruba) and Papiamentu (Curaçao and Bonaire). There are also small minorities of Papiamento speakers on the SSS Islands.

English is official and predominates on Sint Maarten, Saba and Sint Eustatius. Local varieties of Virgin Islands English Creole are also spoken. English is also widely known and spoken on Aruba, Bonaire and Curaçao (especially on Aruba).

Spanish is widely known and spoken on Aruba, Bonaire and Curaçao due to proximity, historical and cultural connections to Venezuela and Colombia. Many Spanish-speaking immigrants from Latin-America also reside on the Dutch Caribbean islands, especially on the ABC Islands.

Dutch is an official language on all six Dutch Caribbean islands, but it is not the native or common language on any of them, although most inhabitants do know and can speak Dutch to varying degrees. Dutch is primarily used in official communications, legal matters, jobs and in education.

Other languages, such as Portuguese, Haitian Creole, French, Italian, Sranan Tongo, German, Chinese, Tagalog, Hindi, are also spoken by smaller communities of speakers.

== See also ==
- Dutch West Indies
- Central banks and currencies of the Caribbean
- Dutch navy in the Caribbean
- Dutch Caribbean Nature Alliance
- Dutch nationality law
- Curaçaoans in the Netherlands
- Arubans in the Netherlands
- Sint Maarteners in the Netherlands
