= 1975 Netherlands Antilles island council elections =

Island council elections were held in the Netherlands Antilles in 1975. They were the seventh elections for the Island Council.

== Aruba ==
=== Results ===
Party	Votes	%	Seats	+/–
People's Electoral Movement	18,374	59.54	13	+6
Aruban Patriotic Party	10,741	34.81	7	–4
Aruban People's Party	1,743	5.65	1	–2
Total	30,858	100.00	21	0
Source: Official Newsletter, Statistical Yearbook

== Saba ==
1975 Saban general election
1975	1979 →
- 5 seats in the Island Council; 3 seats needed for a majority
Party	Leader	Vote %	Seats
WIPM		73.09	4
Netherlands Antilles Democratic		26.91	1
This lists parties that won seats. See the complete results below.

General elections were held in Saba in 1975. The result was a victory for the Windward Islands People's Movement, which won four of the five seats in the Island Council.

=== Results ===
Party	Votes	%	Seats	+/–
Windward Islands People's Movement	421	73.09	4	+1
Democratic Party	155	26.91	1	–1
Total	576	100.00	5	0
Source: Johnson

== Sint Maarten ==
General elections were held in Sint Maarten on 9 May 1975 to elect the 5 members of the Island Council. The result was a victory for the Democratic Party, which won all five Island Council seats.

=== Results ===
Party	Votes	%	Seats	+/–
Democratic Party	2,081		5	+1
United Federation of the Antilles	378		0	New
Windward Islands People's Movement	362		0	0
Antillean Labor Movement	168		0	New
IPPP	98		0	New
Total			5	0
Source: Lynch & Lynch
