= 1979 Netherlands Antilles island council elections =

Island council elections were held in the Netherlands Antilles in April 1979. They were the eighth elections for the Island Council.

== Aruba ==
Party	Votes	%	Seats	+/–
People's Electoral Movement	18,551	56.60	12	–1
Aruban People's Party	6,063	18.50	4	+3
Aruban Patriotic Party	4,867	14.85	3	–4
United Reform Party of Aruba	3,181	9.71	2	New
UNA–PIA	113	0.34	0	New
Total	32,775	100.00	21	–

== Bonaire ==
Party	Votes	%	Seats
Bonaire Patriotic Union	2,184	52.73	5
Bonaire Democratic Party	1,529	36.91	4
Bonairean Workers' Party	429	10.36	0
Total	4,142	100.00	9

== Curaçao ==
Party	Votes	%	Seats
Democratic Party	16,958	24.84	6
Partido MAN	16,472	24.13	6
National People's Party/U	15,275	22.38	5
Social Democratic Party	10,701	15.68	3
Workers' Liberation Front	5,067	7.42	1
META	2,541	3.72	0
Alianza	1,253	1.84	0
Total	68,267	100.00	21

== Saba ==
General elections were held in Saba on 27 April 1979. The result was a victory for the Windward Islands People's Movement, which won all five Island Council seats.

Party	Votes	%	Seats	+/–
Windward Islands People's Movement	483	81.04	5	+1
Saba People's Party	113	18.96	0	New
Total	596	100.00	5	0
Source: Johnson

== Sint Maarten ==
General elections were held in Sint Maarten on 27 April 1979 to elect the 5 members of the Island Council. The result was a victory for the Democratic Party, which won three of the five Island Council seats.

Party	Votes	%	Seats	+/–
Democratic Party	2,126	50.50	3	–1
Sint Maarten Patriotic Movement	1,443	34.28	2	New
Windward Islands People's Movement	366	8.69	0	0
United Progressive Democratic Group	275	6.53	0	New
Total	4,210	100.00	5	0
Source: Lynch & Lynch
