= Forsa Kòrsou =

Political party in Curaçao

The Forsa Kòrsou (lit. 'Upwards Curaçao') is a political party in Curaçao, which had seats in the island council of Curaçao and the estates of the Netherlands Antilles. The party is led by former lawyer Nelson Navarro. At the elections in the Netherlands Antilles of 2006, the party won 2 of the 14 seats of the Curaçao constituency in the 22 seat Estates of the Netherlands Antilles. In the last Netherlands Antilles general election in 2010, the party participated together with NPA and MAN obtaining 5 seats.

The party obtained a seat in the 2007 island council elections.
