= Wilson Godett =

Curacao politician

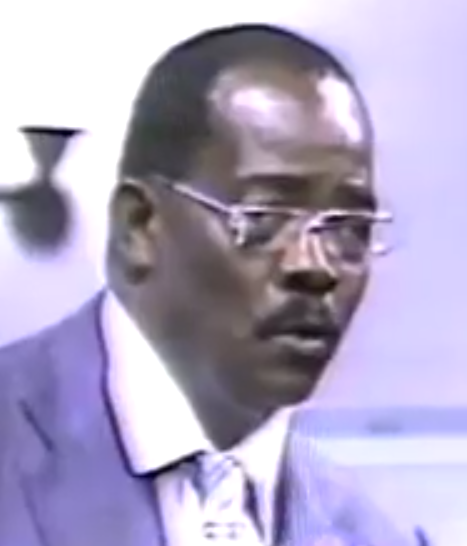
- Born: August 11, 1932; Curaçao
- Died: April 19, 1999 (aged 66); Curaçao
- Known for: Professional boxing, politics
- Spouse: Normma Merenciana
- Children: 1

Wilson Godett (11 August 1932 - 19 April 1995) was a politician and professional boxer from the island of Curaçao. Before politics, Godett was an elite Caribbean boxer who was known in the ring as "Papa Diamante Negro" (Papa Black Diamond). Godett was also a co-founder of the political party known as "Front Obrero y Liberacion 30 di Mei" (Workers Front and Liberation 30 May).

== Early life and career ==
Wilson grew up in the neighborhood of Otrobanda, an impoverished working-class neighborhood in Willemstad at the time. Due to the economic state of Godett's area, he had to drop out of school early and work to survive. Godett and his friends often swam across Anna Bay to use Venezuelan trading boats to trade for fruit and scavenge. Godett was a middleweight boxing contender, and fought under the name "Papa Diamante Negro" (Papa Black Diamond). During his boxing career which spanned from 1950-1962 he married Normma Merenciana. He became the Caribbean Champion in 1954, and captured Middleweight Championship of Curaçao in both 1955 and 1962. On January 29, 1954 Godett and his wife Normma had their oldest child named Mirna Louisa-Godett. Although he didn't fight competitively after his last title fight, he continued being a referee in professional boxing games across Curaçao, Aruba, and Jamaica into the 1990's.

After boxing Godett used his boxing fame and his working class background to go into labor advocacy. He was elected chairman of the Algemene Haven Unie (General Dockworkers Union) during the 1960's. He created alliances with local underground media such as vitó, a Papiamentotu-language publication. On May 30 1969, also known as Trinta di Mei, Wilson Godett, while protesting, was shot in chest by police in Parera while having a heated confrontation. After his recovery the colonial government arrested Godett and jailed him for inciting riots. While imprisoned he co-founded a new political party called Frente Oberon Liberashon 30 di Mei (Workers' Liberation Front). Even though he was in jail, the public overwhelmingly voted for the Workers' Liberation Front. This led to Godett and his fellow leaders to be elected into parliament while still imprisoned. After being elected, Godett and his colleagues were escorted straight from their jail cells to the Governor's Palace to take their place as government Senators. Gobett remained politically influential, eventually leading to the islands Minster of Labor. Even though his career was stopped early his daughter Mirna carried on his legacy in politics.
