= January 2024 Sint Maarten general election =

- 11 January 2024
- All 15 seats in Parliament; 8 seats needed for a majority
- Turnout: 65.51% (▲5.95pp)
| Party | Leader | Vote % | Seats | +/– |
|---|---|---|---|---|
| NA | Silveria Jacobs | 23.92 | 4 | −2 |
| UPP | Rolando Brison | 19.48 | 3 | −1 |
| URSM | Luc Mercelina | 14.04 | 2 | New |
| DP | Sarah Wescot-Williams | 13.64 | 2 | +1 |
| PFP | Melissa Gumbs | 11.89 | 2 | 0 |
| NOW | Christophe Emmanuel | 10.25 | 2 | New |
This lists parties that won seats. See the complete results below.
| Prime Minister before | Prime Minister after |
|---|---|
| Silveria Jacobs; NA | Luc Mercelina; USRM |

General elections were held in Sint Maarten on 11 January 2024.

== Electoral system ==
The 15 seats in the Estates were elected by proportional representation. In order to participate in the election, new parties and parties without a seat in parliament were required to obtain at least 134 signatures; 1% of the valid votes of the 2020 general elections.

== Results ==
Preliminary results were released at the end of the night of the election, with official results announced by the Central Voting Bureau on 18 January.

| Party | Votes | % | Seats | +/– |
|---|---|---|---|---|
| National Alliance | 3,455 | 23.92 | 4 | –2 |
| United People's Party | 2,814 | 19.48 | 3 | –1 |
| Unified Resilient St. Maarten Movement | 2,028 | 14.04 | 2 | New |
| Democratic Party | 1,970 | 13.64 | 2 | +1 (Note: Ran in the 2020 election as the United Democrats, winning one seat) |
| Party for Progress | 1,717 | 11.89 | 2 | 0 |
| Nation Opportunity Wealth | 1,481 | 10.25 | 2 | New |
| United St. Maarten Party | 686 | 4.75 | 0 | –2 |
| Empire Culture Empowerment Association | 292 | 2.02 | 0 | New |
| Total | 14,443 | 100.00 | 15 | 0 |
| Valid votes | 14,443 | 97.75 | | |
| Invalid votes | 332 | 2.25 | | |
| Blank votes | 0 | 0.00 | | |
| Total votes | 14,775 | 100.00 | | |
| Registered voters/turnout | 22,553 | 65.51 | | |
Source: Government of Sint Maarten

== Aftermath ==
A four-party government was formed between the Unified Resilient St. Maarten Movement (URSM), the Democratic Party, the Party for Progress and Nation Opportunity Wealth, all of which won two seats. Luc Mercelina's URSM, having received the most votes of the 4 parties, lead the new government with Mercelina as Prime Minister. Elected members took office on 10 February 2024, followed by a coalition deal on 21 February. The new government with Mercelina as Prime minister eventually took the oath of office on 3 May. However, the government collapsed 18 days later as Kevin Maingrette, an MP from the Nation Opportunity Wealth party, left the coalition to join the opposition. This crossing the floor cost the coalition its majority, leading Mercelina to dissolve parliament and call snap elections.

On 1 August 2024 United People's Party MP Akeem Arrindell was arrested for conspiring to buy votes in the January elections. He subsequently lost his seat in that month's snap elections and was sentenced on 8 January 2025 to a prison sentence and a six and a half year ban on serving in public office.
