= National Democratic Party (Sint Maarten) =

Political Party

The National Democratic Party (formerly the St. Maarten Liberation Movement or SLM) was a nationalist political party in Sint Maarten. Founded by Theophilus Priest, the party first contested national elections in 1999, but received only 7 votes, and failed to win a seat. They ran again in the 2003 receiving 41 votes, and again in the 2007 elections under the name Freedom Slate of the National Democratic Party, receiving 20 votes. The party did not contest any further elections.
