= 2011 Dutch island council elections =

- 2 March 2011
- All 19 seats in the island councils of Bonaire (9), Saba (5) and Sint Eustatius (5)
Party	Leader	Vote %	Seats	+/–
Elected in Bonaire
UPB	Ramonsito Booi	40.29	4	−1
PDB	Robby Beukenboom	33.31	3	−1
MBL	Benito Dirksz	10.88	1	New
PHU	Michiel Bijkerk	8.61	1	New
(Saba (island)) Elected in Saba
WIPM	Rolando Wilson	83.35	4	0
SLP	Ishmael Levenston	16.65	1	0
Elected in Sint Eustatius
DP	Reuben Merkman	35.24	2	−2
UPC	Reginald Zaandam	24.65	1	New
PLP	Clyde van Putten	20.26	1	0
STEP	Franklin Brown	17.55	1	+1
This lists parties that won seats. See the complete results below.

Island council elections were held in the Caribbean Netherlands on 2 March 2011 to elect the members of the island councils of Bonaire, Saba, and Sint Eustatius. They were the first island council elections since the dissolution of the Netherlands Antilles in 2010.

The elections were held on the same day as the provincial elections in the European Netherlands. The Bonaire Patriotic Union won the election (4 seats) in Bonaire, the Windward Islands People's Movement (4 seats) in Saba, and the Democratic Party (2 seats) in Sint Eustatius.

== Results ==
=== Bonaire ===
Party	Votes	%	Seats	+/–
Bonaire Patriotic Union	3,040	40.29	4	–1
Bonaire Democratic Party	2,513	33.31	3	–1
Free Bonaire Movement	821	10.88	1	New
Party for Justice and Unity	650	8.61	1	New
Soleana List	521	6.91	0	New
Total	7,545	100.00	9	0
Valid votes	7,545	98.31		
Invalid/blank votes	130	1.69		
Total votes	7,675	100.00		
Registered voters/turnout	10,174	75.44		
Source: Kiesraad

=== Saba ===
Party	Votes	%	Seats	+/–
Windward Islands People's Movement	686	83.35	4	0
Saba Labour Party	137	16.65	1	0
Total	823	100.00	5	0
Valid votes	823	98.68		
Invalid/blank votes	11	1.32		
Total votes	834	100.00		
Registered voters/turnout	960	86.88		
Source: Kiesraad

=== Sint Eustatius ===
Party	Votes	%	Seats	+/–
Democratic Party	506	35.24	2	–2
United People's Coalition	354	24.65	1	New
Progressive Labour Party	291	20.26	1	0
St. Eustatius Empowerment Party	252	17.55	1	+1
List 4 (Wilhelm Joshua Spanner)	33	2.30	0	New
Total	1,436	100.00	5	0
Valid votes	1,436	98.69		
Invalid/blank votes	19	1.31		
Total votes	1,455	100.00		
Registered voters/turnout	2,140	67.99		
Source: Kiesraad
