= Democratic Party Sint Maarten =

Democratic Party Sint Maarten Democratische Partij Sint Maarten
- Leader: Sarah Wescott-Williams
- President: Hasani Ellis
- Founder: Claude Wathey; Clem Labega
- Founded: 1954 (original); 22 January 2023 (refounded)
- Dissolved: November 2017 (refounded in January 2023)
- Split from: Curaçao Democratic Party (original); United Democrats (2023)
- Merged into: United Democrats (2017)
- Youth wing: Professional Young Persons
- Ideology: Social liberalism Progressivism
- Political position: Centre to centre-left
- Colours: Red
- Parliament of Sint Maarten: 3 / 15

Website
- www.dpsxm.com

The Democratic Party Sint Maarten (Dutch: Democratische Partij Sint Maarten) is a political party in Sint Maarten. The party was long associated with its powerful leader, business tycoon Claude Wathey. Wathey stepped down from his leadership post in 1992. The party was dissolved in 2017 and refounded in 2023.

== Dissolution and refoundation ==
In the aftermath of Hurricane Irma, which hit the island hard on 6 September 2017 and paralyzed the economy, the Democratic Party and the United People's Party decided to merge to form the United Democrats.

Five years later, on 10 January 2023, a party congress was announced to take place on 22 January. Party leader Sarah Wescott-Williams cited Sint Maarten's "personal (individual) political system" as a cause for political instability and described the upcoming congress as "more than the usual annual council meeting of the party" and a "regeneration meeting".

== Election results ==
=== Netherlands Antilles Island Council elections ===
Election	Leader	Votes	%	Seats	+/–
1955	Claude Wathey	365	66.97%	4 / 5	New
1959	Claude Wathey	392	63.84%	4 / 5	0
1963	Claude Wathey	613	71.73%	4 / 5	0
1967	Claude Wathey	Unopposed		5 / 5	▲1
1971	Claude Wathey	1,234	59.44%	4 / 5	▼1
1975	Claude Wathey	2,081		5 / 5	▲1
1979	Claude Wathey	2,126	50.50%	3 / 5	▼2
1983	Claude Wathey	3,342	66.85%	5 / 7	▲2
1987	Claude Wathey	5,036	74.19%	7 / 9	▲2
1991	Claude Wathey	2,837	32.88%	3 / 9	▼4
1995	Sarah Wescott-Williams	4,323	45.81%	5 / 11	▲2
1999	Sarah Wescott-Williams	5,601	54.42%	7 / 11	▲2
2003	Sarah Wescott-Williams	4,919	48.38%	6 / 11	▼1
2007	Sarah Wescott-Williams	6,635	49.48%	6 / 11	0

=== Sint Maarten general elections ===
Election	Leader	Votes	%	Seats	+/–	Status
2010	Sarah Wescott-Williams	2,340	17.11%	2 / 15	▼4	Coalition
2014	Sarah Wescott-Williams	2,398	16.54%	2 / 15	0	Opposition (2014-2015)
2014	Sarah Wescott-Williams	2,398	16.54%	2 / 15	0	Coalition (2015-2016)
2016	Sarah Wescott-Williams	1,813	12.76%	2 / 15	0	Coalition (2016-2017)
2016	Sarah Wescott-Williams	1,813	12.76%	2 / 15	0	Opposition (2017-2018)
2018	Merged into United Democrats					
2020	Merged into United Democrats					
Jan 2024	Sarah Wescot-Williams	1,970	13.64%	2 / 15	▲2	Coalition
Aug 2024	Sarah Wescot-Williams	2,069	15.12%	3 / 15	▲1	TBA

== See also ==
- Democratic Party (Sint Eustatius)
