= ABC islands =

Three Dutch-ruled islands in the Leeward Antilles

Coordinates: 12.27°N 69.08°W

ABC islands: ABC-Eilanden (Dutch); Islanan ABK (Papiamento)
- From left to right, Aruba, Curaçao, and Bonaire

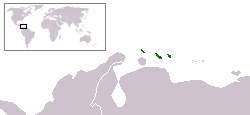
- Location of ABC islands in the Leeward Antilles
- Capitals: (Aruba) Oranjestad; (Bonaire) Kralendijk; (Curaçao) Willemstad
- Languages: Dutch; English; Papiamento
- Demonyms: (Aruba) Aruban; (Bonaire) Bonairean; (Curaçao) Curaçaoan
- Islands: 2 constituent countries; Aruba; Curaçao; 1 special municipality; Bonaire

Area
  - Total: 912 km^{2} (352 sq mi)

Population
  - 2022 estimate: 300,000
  - Density: 298/km^{2} (771.8/sq mi)
- GDP (PPP): estimate
  - Total: $15.977 billion
  - Per capita: $47,683
- GDP (nominal): estimate
  - Total: $18.852 billion
  - Per capita: $47,113
- HDI: 0.833 very high
- Currency: (Aruba) Aruban florin; (Bonaire) United States dollar; (Curaçao) Caribbean guilder
- Today part of: Kingdom of the Netherlands

The ABC islands are the physical group of Aruba, Bonaire, and Curaçao, the three westernmost islands of the Leeward Antilles in the Caribbean Sea. These islands have a shared political history and a status of Dutch underlying ownership, since the Anglo-Dutch Treaty of 1814 ceded them back to the Kingdom of the Netherlands, as Curaçao and Dependencies from 1815. They are a short distance north of the Falcón State, Venezuela. Aruba and Curaçao are autonomous, self governing constituent countries of the Kingdom of the Netherlands, while Bonaire is a special municipality of the Netherlands. Territories of the Kingdom of the Netherlands, the countries, and its special municipalities, are outside the European Union; citizens have Dutch nationality and the former colonial power benefits from preferential trade, mineral and natural resource rights, particularly offshore.

== History ==
Arawakan people such as the Caquetio are indigenous to the ABC islands. According to the disputed letters of Amerigo Vespucci, the first European to explore the ABC islands was one of Christopher Columbus' captains, Alonso de Ojeda, who landed on Curaçao in 1499. He is said to have called the islands Las islas de los Gigantes or Islands of the Giants due to the native inhabitants, the Caiquetio Indians. The first known European exploration was by Amerigo Vespucci, whose cartographer Juan de la Cosa first described the islands. By 1527 the Spanish had formed a government and established Catholicism on the islands.

In 1634, the Netherlands fought Spain over control of the islands. The Dutch won, (although Spain won them back before abandoning them due to them being of little value to the Spanish) and the islands were then administered by the Netherlands. The Dutch West India Company established a major port on Curaçao and began importing West-African slaves to the island and to nearby Bonaire. On Aruba however, slavery was not as widespread due to island being considered too dry by the Dutch and Spanish for large plantations.

The abolition of slavery in 1863 had a devastating impact on the plantation-driven economies of Curaçao and Bonaire. The ABC islands gained newfound economic importance when oil was discovered in Venezuela during the early 20th century, the islands became sites of major oil refineries. Oil refining on the islands aided heavily in the Allied war effort during World War II.

From 1815 until 1954 the three islands were known as the Colony of Curaçao and Dependencies. This colony at various times also included Netherlands Suriname and Sint Eustatius and Dependencies. In 1954, the ABC islands were grouped together and became part of the Netherlands Antilles, which gave the islands political autonomy within the Kingdom of the Netherlands. Although within The Netherlands Antilles, political power was largely dominated and held by Curaçao.

In 1986, Aruba seceded from the Netherlands Antilles after a 30-year political battle for separation, becoming a separate country within the kingdom. Upon the dissolution of the Netherlands Antilles on 10 October 2010, Curaçao gained a similar status to Aruba. Bonaire became a special municipality of the Netherlands proper, although it maintains its status of an overseas territory of the European Union.

== Geography and climate ==
Flag of Aruba

Flag of Bonaire

Flag of Curaçao

The ABC islands are part of the Leeward Antilles, which is the westernmost area of the Lesser Antilles. They lie immediately to the north of Falcón State, Venezuela. Due to their political history, they are sometimes considered to be part of North America along with the other Caribbean islands, but are on South America's geographical plate and continental shelf as with Trinidad and Tobago.

ABC does not indicate the geographical order to each other; from west to east the islands are Aruba, Curaçao, and Bonaire. Aruba is a flat island, much coastal land being exposed to tidal storm surges. Bonaire and Curaçao are surrounded by reefs, and so are much more sheltered from this. Bonaire's and Curaçao's reefs are popular tourist destinations.

The ABC islands have an atypical hot desert climate seen in hot pockets of Australia, Köppen climate classification BWh and BWk, with some notable rain but an excess of evaporation over precipitation. Surfaces on these islands hold little moisture and evaporate the little rainfall they receive. In addition, Aruba–Curaçao–Bonaire cactus scrub is the most common vegetation on these islands. Furthermore, the ABC islands are very dry as they lie north of the Intertropical Convergence Zone. Only in their short rainy season from October to December or January are they exposed to showers or storms formed from the northeast trade winds. The rainy season is powerfully influenced by the Southern Oscillation resulting in very high variability. During strong El Niño years like 1911/1912, 1930/1931, 1982/1983, and 1997/1998, annual (fiscal year) rainfall can be less than 200 millimetres or 8 inches, and even under 100 millimetres or 4 inches in Curação in 1911/1912. As much as 1,100 millimetres or 43 inches fell during strong La Niña northern hemisphere winters: 1933/1934, 1970/1971, 1988/1989, 1999/2000, 2010/2011, and 2020/2021, with the highest monthly totals being over 350 millimetres or 14 inches.

Temperatures in the ABC islands are uniformly hot, averaging around 28 to 37 °C (82.4 to 98.6 °F) year-round, with comfortable humidity and minima rarely falling below 25 °C or 77 °F even on the mildest mornings, although afternoons rarely top 38 °C or 100 °F.

=== Environment ===
Bonaire is known for being a "diving paradise", with ecotourism playing a large part in its economy. The islands have a huge variety of wildlife, including flamingos and four species of sea turtle.

Aruba set aside 20% of its land for a National Park to protect and conserve its wildlife, known as Arikok National Park. The island is widely known for its beaches and low amounts of rainfall (even less rainfall than Curaçao and Bonaire).

== Demographics ==
People of African descent make up the majorities of Curaçao and Bonaire's populations, while people of Mestizo and European descent make up the majority of Aruba's population. Inhabitants of other descent and various nationalities are also present on each island.

The islands have received substantial immigration in recent decades, namely from South America, other Caribbean islands, Europe, Asia and North America. Significant numbers of Venezuelan refugees also reside on the ABC islands.

=== Language ===
Multilingualism is prevalent in the ABC Islands, with most inhabitants speaking multiple languages.

Dutch has been the official language of the islands for most of their history since European contact, it is the language of education and government. However Dutch is not the common language on any of the ABC Islands.

Papiamentu (Papiamento on Aruba), a Portuguese creole language, is the most widely spoken language on all three ABC islands. There are two main dialects of the language, Papiamentu (Curaçao, Bonaire) and Papiamento (Aruba). Unlike many other creole languages, Papiamento/u has and is not decreasing in usage. It has been made an official language on Aruba since 2003 and later official on in Curaçao and Bonaire since 2007. Papiamento/u is based on Portuguese/Spanish with significant influences from Dutch, English, French, West African and Amerindian languages.

Spanish and English are also widely known and spoken on the ABC islands. Spanish due to historical ties and proximity to Latin America, and English due to North American tourism.

Other languages brought over by immigrants such as Chinese, Portuguese, French, Italian, Sranan Tongo and others are also spoken by smaller communities of speakers on the islands.

== Politics ==
Aruba and Curaçao are autonomous countries of the Kingdom of the Netherlands, which have their own parliament and prime minister. Bonaire is a "special municipality" of the Netherlands proper, and subject to Dutch law.

Aruba, Bonaire, and Curaçao are Overseas Countries and Territories of the European Union, meaning that all three islands are special territories of a European Union member state but not part of the European Union themselves. Citizens of these islands are Dutch citizens and thus hold European passports and can vote in European parliament elections. In addition, the islands get European development funds and students on the islands can also apply for Erasmus program from the islands. However, the islands are not in the European Union itself or the Schengen area.

== See also ==
- BES islands (Bonaire, Sint Eustatius, and Saba)
- Dutch Empire
- SSS islands (Saba, Sint Eustatius, and Sint Maarten)
