= Sint Maarten Patriotic Alliance =

The Sint Maarten Patriotic Alliance (Dutch: Sint Maarten Patriottische Alliantie) is a political party in Sint Maarten. Formed in 1990, the party gained four seats in the 1991 Island Council Election. At the 2002 legislative elections in the Netherlands Antilles, the party joined the National Alliance that won 4.8% of the popular vote and 1 out of 22 seats.
