= Bonaire Social Party =

The Bonaire Social Party (PABOSO, Spanish: Partido Boneriano Sosial) is a political party in Bonaire, the Netherlands Antilles. It ran in the 2002 Netherlands Antilles general election, but won only 1.0% of the popular vote and none of the 22 Parliament seats.
