= SSS islands =

Group of islands in the Dutch Caribbean

Windward Islands Bovenwindse Eilanden (Dutch)
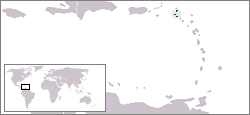

Geography
- Location: Leeward Islands; Lesser Antilles; Caribbean Sea
- Coordinates: 18.0167°N 63.0333°W
- Total islands: 3
- Major islands: Saba; Saint Martin; Sint Eustatius

Demographics
- Population: ~85.000 (2025 estimate)
- Languages: English (Netherlands Antilles Creole); Dutch; French

The SSS islands (Dutch: SSS-eilanden), locally also known as the Dutch Windward Islands (Bovenwindse Eilanden or Bovenwinden), is a collective term for the three territories of the Dutch Caribbean (formerly the Netherlands Antilles) that are located within the Leeward Islands group of the Lesser Antilles in the Caribbean Sea. In order of population size, they are: Sint Maarten, Sint Eustatius, and Saba. In some contexts, the term is also used to refer to the entire island of Saint Martin (which also includes the Collectivity of Saint Martin), alongside Sint Eustatius and Saba.

The SSS islands were island territories of the Netherlands Antilles, until its dissolution in 2010. Since then, Sint Maarten is a constituent country of the Kingdom of the Netherlands, while Sint Eustatius and Saba are special municipalities of the Netherlands. "SSS" is an acronym of the islands' names, and is analogous to the ABC, CAS, and BES islands, which are other commonly used subdivisions of the Dutch Caribbean.

== History ==
The island of Saint Martin was split between France and the Netherlands in 1648. The Dutch part, together with Sint Eustatius and Saba, became a single Dutch colony in 1815 as Sint Eustatius and Dependencies (Sint Eustatius en Onderhorigheden). In 1828, this colony was merged with the colonies Curaçao and Dependencies (the ABC islands) and Surinam, with Paramaribo as its capital. When this merger was partly reversed in 1845, the Dutch part of the SSS islands became part of Curaçao and Dependencies, with Willemstad as its capital. This colony became the Netherlands Antilles in 1954.

As part of the Netherlands Antilles, the SSS islands initially formed a single island territory (eilandgebied) as the Windward Islands. In 1983, it was split up into three separate island territories, each with a separate island council. After the dissolution of the Netherlands Antilles on 10 October 2010, Sint Eustatius and Saba became special municipalities of the Netherlands, while Sint Maarten became an independent country within the Kingdom of the Netherlands.

== Composition ==
=== Political composition ===
Flag	Territory	Political status	Capital	Area	Population (Jan 2019)	Population density
(Saba (island))	Saba	Special municipality of the Netherlands	The Bottom	13 km^{2} (5.0 sq mi)	1,915	148/km^{2} (380/sq mi)
(Sint Eustatius)	Sint Eustatius	Special municipality of the Netherlands	Oranjestad	21 km^{2} (8.1 sq mi)	3,138	150/km^{2} (390/sq mi)
(Sint Maarten)	Sint Maarten	Constituent country of the Kingdom of the Netherlands	Philipsburg	34 km^{2} (13 sq mi)	41,486	1,221/km^{2} (3,160/sq mi)
Total				68 km^{2} (26 sq mi)	46,539	684/km^{2} (1,770/sq mi)

=== Geographical composition ===
Map	Island	Country	Largest town	Area	Population (Jan 2019)	Population density
	Saba	Netherlands	The Bottom	13 km^{2} (5.0 sq mi)	1,915	148/km^{2} (380/sq mi)
	Saint Martin	France (north); Sint Maarten (south)	Lower Prince's Quarter	87 km^{2} (34 sq mi)	73,666	847/km^{2} (2,190/sq mi)
	Sint Eustatius	Netherlands	Oranjestad	21 km^{2} (8.1 sq mi)	3,138	150/km^{2} (390/sq mi)
Total				121 km^{2} (47 sq mi)	78,719	651/km^{2} (1,690/sq mi)

== See also ==
- Windward Islands People's Movement
