= Windward Islands People's Movement =

- Leader: Rolando Wilson
- President: Bruce Zagers
- Founded: 1970; 55 years ago
- Preceded by: Windward Islands People’s Party
- Ideology: Christian democracy
- Political position: Centre-right
- Regional affiliation: Christian Democrat Organization of America
- Colours: Orange
- Saba Island council: 3 / 5

The Windward Islands People's Movement (WIPM) is a political party in Saba. It has won a majority of seats in the Island Council in all but two elections since 1971.

It held all five seats in the Island Council after the 2019 elections and until June 1, 2022, when council member Hemmie Van Xanten resigned from the party while continuing to serve as a councilor. When party member Esmeralda Johnson was elected to a seat on the island council in 2019, she became the youngest person ever to serve on it.

== Netherlands Antilles ==
Until the dissolution of the Netherlands Antilles, the party competed in island council elections and for the single Saba seat in the Estates of the Netherlands Antilles (which it won in the 2002, 2006 and 2010 elections). The party has also participated in the island council elections of Sint Eustatius and Sint Maarten (until its merger with the Sint Maarten Patriotic Movement (S.P.M.)).

When Saba became part of the Netherlands as a special municipality in 2010, the 2007 island council stayed (where the party obtained four of the five seats) until the election under Dutch law in 2011.

== Island Council electoral results ==
Election	Votes	%	Seats	+/–	Government
1971			3 / 5		Majority
1975	421	73.09	4 / 5	▲1	Majority
1979	483	81.04	5 / 5	▲1	Majority
1983	470	77.43	4 / 5	▼1	Majority
1987	328	51.01	2 / 5	▼2	Opposition
1991	437	71.99	4 / 5	▲2	Majority
1995	346	54.75	2 / 5	▼2	Opposition
1999	400	70.67	4 / 5	▲2	Majority
2003	298	47.30	3 / 5	▼1	Majority
2007	447	73.8	4 / 5	▲1	Majority
2011	686	83.4	4 / 5	0	Majority
2015	545	57.2	3 / 5	▼1	Majority
2019	777	79.04	5 / 5	▲2	Majority
2023	617	59.33	3 / 5	▼2	Majority
