= Island territories of the Netherlands Antilles =

First-level administrative division in the Netherlands Antilles

Island territories of the Netherlands Antilles Eilandgebieden (Dutch)
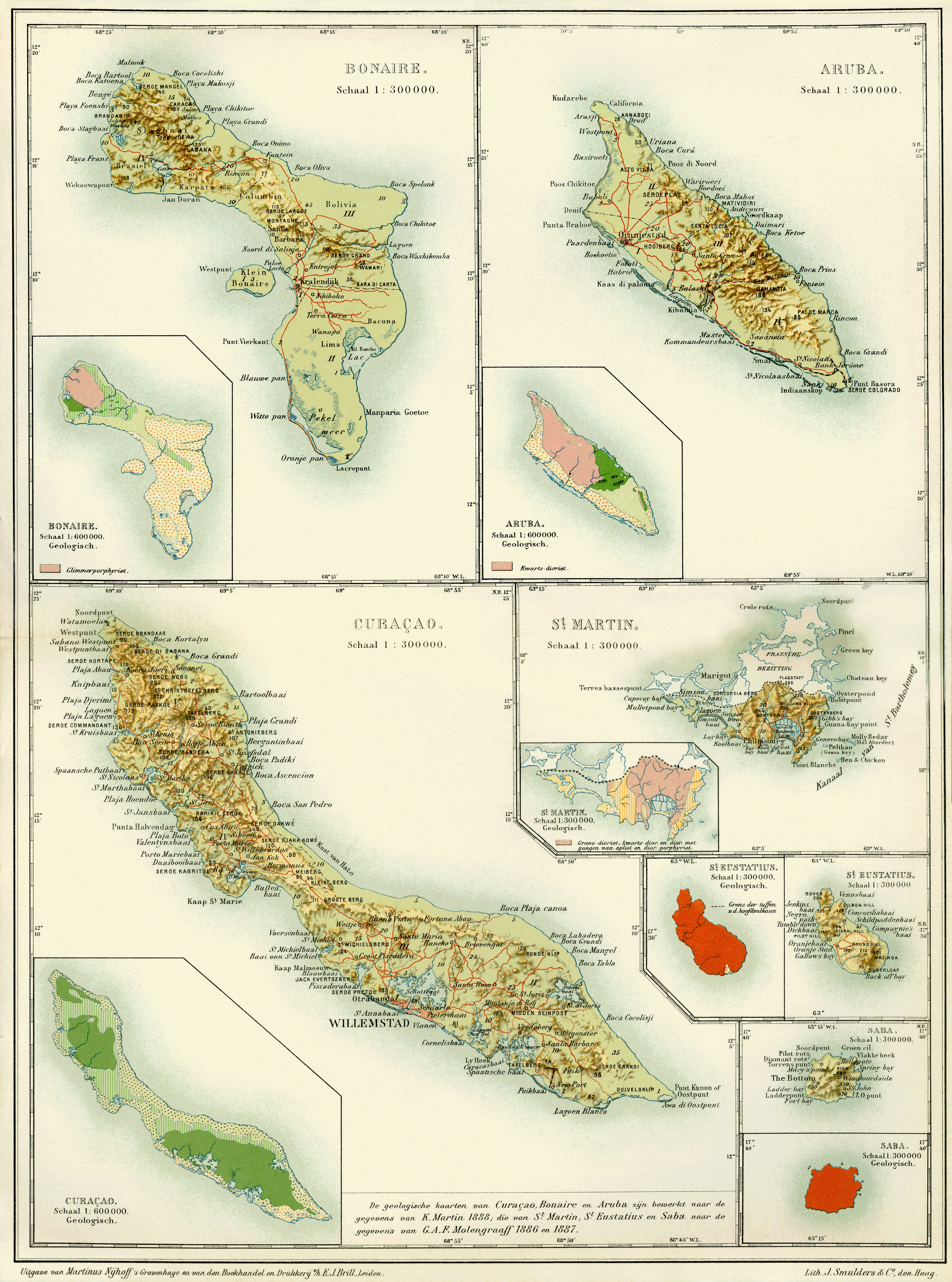
- Location: Netherlands Antilles
- Created: 3 March 1951
- Abolished: 10 October 2010
- Number: 1951–1982: 4 island territories; 1983–1985: 6 island territories; 1986–2010: 5 island territories
- Areas: Minimum: Saba, 13 km^{2} (5 sq mi); Maximum: Curaçao, 444 km^{2} (171 sq mi)
- Government: Executive council
- Subdivisions: Cities

The island territories of the Netherlands Antilles (Dutch: eilandgebieden) were the top-level administrative subdivisions of the Netherlands Antilles. The government of each island territory consisted of three major parts:

- The island council (eilandsraad) – the local parliament, elected every four years.
- The executive council (bestuurscollege) – the executive board of the island territory, comparable to the Dutch provincial executive and municipal executive.
- The lieutenant governor (gezaghebber) – chair of the island council and executive council, appointed by the Crown for a six-year term.

== List of island territories ==
Flag	Timespan			Capital	Area
Flag	1951–1982	1983–1985	1986–2010	Capital	Area
(Aruba)	Aruba		Status aparte since 1986	Oranjestad	180 km^{2} (69 sq mi)
(Bonaire)	Bonaire			Kralendijk	294 km^{2} (114 sq mi)
(Curaçao)	Curaçao			Willemstad	444 km^{2} (171 sq mi)
(Saba (island))	Windward Islands	Saba		The Bottom	13 km^{2} (5.0 sq mi)
(Sint Eustatius)	Windward Islands	Sint Eustatius		Oranjestad	21 km^{2} (8.1 sq mi)
(Sint Maarten)	Windward Islands	Sint Maarten		Philipsburg	34 km^{2} (13 sq mi)

== See also ==
- Islands Regulation of the Netherlands Antilles
- Caribbean Netherlands
- Dutch Caribbean
