= Island council (Netherlands Antilles) =

1954–2010 governing body in the isles of the Netherlands Antilles

An island council was the governing body of an island territory, an administrative level of the Netherlands Antilles until its dissolution.

Island councils existed for:

- Aruba (until its secession from the Netherlands Antilles in 1986)
- Bonaire
- Curaçao
- (Saba (island)) Saba
- Sint Eustatius
- Sint Maarten

The latter three were until 1 April 1983 governed by a single island council:

- Windward Islands (Dutch: de Bovenwindse eilanden)

== Dissolution of the Netherlands Antilles ==
Upon the dissolution of the Netherlands Antilles in 2010, the island councils of Curaçao and Sint Maarten have become the Estates of Curaçao and the Estates of Sint Maarten respectively. The island councils of Bonaire, Sint Eustatius, and Saba (the Caribbean Netherlands), kept their name and became island councils of the special municipalities of the Netherlands.
