= 2019 Dutch island council elections =

← 2015	20 March 2019	2023 →
- All 9 seats in the Island Council of Bonaire; All 5 seats in the Island Council of Saba
- Turnout: 66.17%
Party	Leader	Vote %	Seats	+/–
Elected in Bonaire
MPB	Elvis Tjin Asjoe	40.42	4	+1
PDB	Clark Abraham	24.10	3	0
UPB	James Kroon	20.25	2	−1
(Saba (island)) Elected in Saba
WIPM	Rolando Wilson	79.04	5	+2
This lists parties that won seats. See the complete results below.

Island council elections were held in the Caribbean Netherlands on 20 March 2019 to elect the members of the island councils of Bonaire and Saba. The elections were held on the same day as the electoral college elections in the Caribbean Netherlands, and the provincial and water board elections in the European Netherlands. The election was won by the Bonaire People's Movement (4 seats) in Bonaire and by the Windward Islands People's Movement (5 seats) in Saba.

== Campaign ==
=== Saba ===
The Windward Islands People's Movement (WIPM) made "stability and continuation" their top campaign issues, citing financial leadership and good relationships with the Netherlands. They promised to continue fighting for economic development, a "realistic social minimum", and poverty alleviation by reducing of the cost of living and the cost of doing business on Saba, with commitments to push for more "affordable transportation, energy, and telecommunications", as well as increasing the island's autonomy to allow it to grant work permits. The party's first rally was held on 20 February.

The Saba Labour Party (SLP) submitted its party list on 4 February 2019.

On 2 February 2019, Dave Levenstone announced he would form a new political party to run for a seat on the island council after working for 40 years in government service. He frequently criticized what he saw as a lack of engagement with Sabans. His slogan was "a strong voice for Saba". He submitted a blank list with his name on it.

== Participating parties ==
=== Bonaire ===
List	Party		Lead candidate	Ref.
1	Bonaire People's Movement	MPB	Elvis Tjin Asjoe	
2	Bonaire Democratic Party	PDB	Clark Abraham	
3	Bonaire Patriotic Union	UPB	James Kroon	
4	New Era	EN	Kevin Thodé	
5	List 5		Rafael Santana Rodriguez	
6	Social Progressive Front	FSP	Robby Beukenboom	
7	1 Union for the People	1UPP	Aljano Emerenciana	
8	List 8		Suzy Thodé	

=== Saba ===
List	Party		Lead candidate	Ref.
1	Windward Islands People's Movement	WIPM	Rolando Wilson	
2	Saba Labour Party	SLP	Monique Wilson	
3	List 3		Dave Levenstone	

== Results ==
=== Bonaire ===
Party	Votes	%	Seats	+/–
Bonaire People's Movement	3,575	40.42	4	+1
Bonaire Democratic Party	2,132	24.10	3	0
Bonaire Patriotic Union	1,791	20.25	2	−1
Social Progressive Front	479	5.42	0	New
New Era	394	4.45	0	New
1 Union for the People	367	4.15	0	New
List 5 (Rafael Santana List)	63	0.71	0	New
List 8 (Bonaire Revolution Union)	44	0.50	0	New
Total	8,845	100.00	9	0
Valid votes	8,845	97.63		
Invalid/blank votes	215	2.37		
Total votes	9,060	100.00		
Registered voters/turnout	14,114	64.19		
Source: Konseho Supremo Elektoral

=== Saba ===
Party	Votes	%	Seats	+/–
Windward Islands People's Movement	777	79.04	5	+2
Saba Labour Party	125	12.72	0	−2
United People Movement(UPM)	81	8.24	0	New
Total	983	100.00	5	0
Valid votes	983	98.99		
Invalid/blank votes	10	1.01		
Total votes	993	100.00		
Registered voters/turnout	1,078	92.12		
Source: Kiesraad

== See also ==
- 2020 Sint Eustatius island council election
