= 2019 Dutch Senate election =

- 27 May 2019
- All 75 seats in the Senate; 38 seats needed for a majority
Party	Leader	Vote %	Seats	+/–
FvD	Henk Otten	15.87	12	New
VVD	Annemarie Jorritsma	15.11	12	−1
CDA	Ben Knapen	11.41	9	−3
GL	Paul Rosenmöller	11.18	8	+4
D66	Annelien Bredenoord	8.75	7	−3
PvdA	Mei Li Vos	8.62	6	−2
PVV	Marjolein Faber	6.53	5	−4
SP	Tiny Kox	5.88	4	−5
CU	Mirjam Bikker	5.03	4	+1
PvdD	Niko Koffeman	3.78	3	+1
50+	Martin van Rooijen	3.03	2	0
SGP	Peter Schalk	2.60	2	0
OSF	Gerben Gerbrandy	1.31	1	0
This lists parties that won seats. See the complete results below.
President of the Senate before	President of the Senate after
Ankie Broekers-Knol; VVD	Jan Anthonie Bruijn; VVD

The 2019 election to the Senate of the Netherlands was held on 27 May 2019, two months after the provincial elections.

Forum for Democracy, which took part for the first time, became the largest party. This was later undone by several party splits.

== Electoral system ==
The Senate consists of 75 members elected every four years by the members of the States-Provincial of the country's twelve provinces (and following a law change in 2017, electoral colleges representing the special municipalities of Bonaire, Sint Eustatius and Saba), who are in turn elected directly by the citizens two months earlier in the 2019 provincial and electoral college elections. The seats are distributed in one nationwide constituency using party-list proportional representation.

The value of each elector's vote is determined by the population of the province or special municipality which the elector represents, at a ratio of approximately 1 vote per 100 residents.

Province	Members	Population	Votes	Value per member
South Holland	55	3,674,146	36,740	668
North Holland	55	2,853,488	29,095	519
North Brabant	55	2,544,995	25,465	463
Gelderland	55	2,071,913	20,735	377
Utrecht	49	1,342,194	13,426	274
Overijssel	47	1,156,373	11,562	246
Limburg	47	1,116,127	11,139	237
Friesland	43	647,740	6,493	151
Groningen	43	584,094	5,848	136
Drenthe	41	492,179	4,920	120
Flevoland	41	416,431	4,182	102
Zeeland	39	383,073	3,822	98
Bonaire	9	20,104	198	22
Sint Eustatius	5	3,138	30	6
Saba	5	1,915	20	4

== Seat projections ==
Polling firm	Date(s)	VVD	CDA	D66	PVV	SP	PvdA	GL	CU	PvdD	SGP	50+	OSF	DENK	FVD	Ref.
ANP projection	21 Mar 2019	12	9	6	5	4	7	9	4	3	1	2	0	0	13	
Ipsos exit poll	20 Mar 2019	12	8	7	6	4	7	8	4	3	1	3	1	1	10	
Peil.nl exit poll	20 Mar 2019	12	8	6	6	5	7	7	3	3	2	2	1	1	12	
Peil.nl	19 Mar 2019	11	8	6	7	5	6	8	3	2	2	2	2	2	11	
I&O Research	15–18 Mar 2019	11	8	5	7	6	6	9	4	3	1	2	2	1	10	
Kantar Public	14–17 Mar 2019	13	7	6	6	7	5	6	4	3	2	3	2	2	9	
I&O Research	8–12 Mar 2019	12	8	5	7	7	5	9	3	2	2	3	2	1	9	
Ipsos	8–11 Mar 2019	13	7	5	9	5	6	8	3	4	2	3	2	0	8	
I&O Research	22–26 Feb 2019	11	7	6	8	7	5	10	4	3	2	3	2	1	8	
Ipsos	22–25 Feb 2019	12	7	6	8	5	5	9	4	3	2	3	2	1	8	
2015 election	26 May 2015	13	12	10	9	9	8	4	3	2	2	2	1	–	–	

== Results ==
=== Electors ===
Map showing the largest party by province in the 2019 provincial elections

Results of the 20 March 2019 Dutch Provincial and Senate Electoral College elections
Party or alliance		Votes	%	Seats	+/–
Forum for Democracy		1,057,030	14.51	86	New
People's Party for Freedom and Democracy		1,017,937	13.97	80	–9
CDA-affiliated	Christian Democratic Appeal	805,862	11.06	72	–17
CDA-affiliated	Bonaire Patriotic Union	1,530	0.02	2	New
CDA-affiliated	Democratic Party (Sint Eustatius)	366	0.01	5	New
CDA-affiliated	Total	807,758	11.09	79	–10
GroenLinks		783,006	10.75	61	+31
PvdA-affiliated	Labour Party	619,906	8.51	53	–10
PvdA-affiliated	Bonaire Democratic Party	2,166	0.03	3	New
PvdA-affiliated	Total	622,072	8.54	56	–7
D66-affiliated	Democrats 66	567,363	7.79	41	–26
D66-affiliated	Bonaire People's Movement	3,097	0.04	4	New
D66-affiliated	Total	570,460	7.83	45	–22
Party for Freedom		504,948	6.93	40	–26
Socialist Party		430,096	5.90	35	–35
CU–SGP	Christian Union	353,443	4.85	31	+2
CU–SGP	Reformed Political Party	179,899	2.47	14	–4
CU–SGP	CU–SGP joint list in North Brabant	19,466	0.27	1	–1
CU–SGP	Total	552,808	7.59	46	–3
Party for the Animals		317,104	4.35	20	+2
50PLUS-affiliated	50PLUS	265,215	3.64	17	+3
50PLUS-affiliated	Party for the North	10,527	0.14	2	+1
50PLUS-affiliated	Total	275,742	3.79	19	+4
OSF-affiliated	Local Brabant	25,485	0.35	1	0
OSF-affiliated	Frisian National Party	23,662	0.32	4	0
OSF-affiliated	Groningers' Interests	18,556	0.25	3	0
OSF-affiliated	Local Limburg	18,474	0.25	2	+1
OSF-affiliated	Elderly Party North Holland	18,307	0.25	0	–1
OSF-affiliated	Local Parties South Holland	11,648	0.16	0	New
OSF-affiliated	Local Parties Gelderland – Code Orange	11,053	0.15	0	New
OSF-affiliated	Party for Zeeland	10,619	0.15	2	+1
OSF-affiliated	Locally Strong	9,344	0.13	1	0
OSF-affiliated	U26 Municipalities	6,530	0.09	0	New
OSF-affiliated	Frisian Provincial Interests	5,345	0.07	0	New
OSF-affiliated	Total	159,023	2.18	13	+1
Denk		121,753	1.67	4	New
Code Orange		24,047	0.33	0	New
NIDA		11,347	0.16	0	New
Seniors Brabant		9,687	0.13	0	New
Elderly Appeal - Heart for Brabant		6,719	0.09	0	New
Independent Party Drenthe		3,777	0.05	0	New
Natural Frisian		2,917	0.04	0	New
Jesus Lives		2,323	0.03	0	0
Senior Interests		1,414	0.02	0	0
Politically Active Elders		1,283	0.02	0	0
Respect!		976	0.01	0	New
Windward Islands People's Movement		547	0.01	4	New
Saba Labour Party		110	0.00	1	New
Total		7,284,884	100.00	589	+19
Valid votes		7,284,884	99.41		
Invalid/blank votes		43,014	0.59		
Total votes		7,327,898	100.00		
Registered voters/turnout		13,047,950	56.16		
Source: Kiesraad: European Netherlands (Provincial), Bonaire (EC), Saba (EC), Sint Eustatius (EC)

=== Senate ===
Rutte III lost its majority in the senate.

View source data.
View source data.

Party	Unweighted vote		Weighted vote			Seats	
Party	Votes	%	Votes	%	±pp	Total	+/−
Forum for Democracy	87	14.80	27,473	15.87	New	12	+12
People's Party for Freedom and Democracy	78	13.27	26,157	15.11	–0.68	12	–1
Christian Democratic Appeal	76	12.93	19,756	11.41	–4.20	9	–3
GroenLinks	65	11.05	19,363	11.18	+5.92	8	+4
Democrats 66	50	8.50	15,154	8.75	–3.00	7	–3
Labour Party	56	9.52	14,921	8.62	–2.43	6	–2
Party for Freedom	38	6.46	11,298	6.53	–5.05	5	–4
Socialist Party	35	5.95	10,179	5.88	–6.40	4	–5
Christian Union	33	5.61	8,707	5.03	–0.58	4	+1
Party for the Animals	20	3.40	6,550	3.78	+0.62	3	+1
50PLUS	18	3.06	5,251	3.03	+0.57	2	±0
Reformed Political Party	15	2.55	4,493	2.60	–0.38	2	±0
Independent Senate Group	13	2.21	2,265	1.31	–0.26	1	±0
DENK	4	0.68	1,563	0.90	New	0	±0
Blank list	0	0.00	0	0.00	New	0	±0
Total	588	100.00	173,121	100.00	–	75	±0
Valid votes	588	99.83	173,121	100.00			
Invalid/blank votes	1	0.17	4	0.00			
Total votes	589	100.00	173,125	100.00			
Registered voters/turnout	589	100.00	173,125	100.00			

=== Results summary ===
Popular vote
FvD	14.51%
VVD	13.97%
CDA	11.09%
GL	10.75%
PvdA	8.54%
D66	7.83%
PVV	6.93%
SP	5.90%
CU	4.85%
PvdD	4.35%
50PLUS	3.64%
SGP	2.47%
OSF	2.18%
Denk	1.67%
CU-SGP (NB)	0.27%
Others	1.05%

Unweighted Electoral vote
FvD	14.80%
VVD	13.27%
CDA	12.93%
GL	11.05%
PvdA	9.52%
D66	8.50%
PVV	6.46%
SP	5.95%
CU	5.61%
PvdD	3.40%
50PLUS	3.06%
SGP	2.55%
OSF	2.21%
Denk	0.68%

Weighted Electoral vote
FvD	15.87%
VVD	15.11%
CDA	11.41%
GL	11.18%
D66	8.75%
PvdA	8.62%
PVV	6.53%
SP	5.88%
CU	5.03%
PvdD	3.78%
50PLUS	3.03%
SGP	2.60%
OSF	1.31%
Denk	0.90%

== See also ==
- List of candidates in the 2019 Dutch Senate election
