= 2019 Dutch electoral college elections =

| 20 March 2019 | 2023 → |
- All seats in three electoral colleges for the Senate; 19 out of 589 overall Senate electors
- Turnout: 53.50%
| Party | Leader | Vote % | Seats |
Elected in Bonaire
| MPB | Elvis Tjin Asjoe | 45.59 | 4 |
| PDB | Clark Abraham | 31.89 | 3 |
| UPB | James Kroon | 22.52 | 2 |
(Saba (island)) Elected in Saba
| WIPM | Rolando Wilson | 83.26 | 4 |
| SLP | Monique Wilson | 16.74 | 1 |
Elected in Sint Eustatius
| DP | Adelka Spanner | 100 | 5 |
This lists parties that won seats. See the complete results below.

Electoral college elections were held in the Caribbean Netherlands on 20 March 2019 to elect the members of the electoral colleges for the Senate. The elections were held on the same day as the island council elections in the Caribbean Netherlands, and the provincial and water board elections in the European Netherlands. These elections indirectly determine the composition of the Senate, since the members of the electoral colleges, alongside the States-Provincial elected in the European Netherlands on the same day, will elect the Senate's 75 members in the Senate election on 27 May, two months after the electoral college elections.

== Results ==
=== Bonaire ===
| Party and National affiliate | | Votes | % | Seats |
|---|---|---|---|---|
| Bonaire People's Movement | Democrats 66 | 3,097 | 45.59 | 4 |
| Bonaire Democratic Party | Labour Party | 2,166 | 31.89 | 3 |
| Bonaire Patriotic Union | Christian Democratic Appeal | 1,530 | 22.52 | 2 |
| Total | | 6,793 | 100.00 | 9 |
| Valid votes | | 6,793 | 94.22 | |
| Invalid/blank votes | | 417 | 5.78 | |
| Total votes | | 7,210 | 100.00 | |
| Registered voters/turnout | | 12,649 | 57.00 | |
Source: Kiesraad

=== Saba ===
| Party and National affiliate | | Votes | % | Seats |
|---|---|---|---|---|
| Windward Islands People's Movement | Unafilliated | 547 | 83.26 | 4 |
| Saba Labour Party | Unafilliated | 110 | 16.74 | 1 |
| Total | | 657 | 100.00 | 5 |
| Valid votes | | 657 | 98.95 | |
| Invalid/blank votes | | 7 | 1.05 | |
| Total votes | | 664 | 100.00 | |
| Registered voters/turnout | | 905 | 73.37 | |
Source: Kiesraad, Saba News, Saba News

=== Sint Eustatius ===
| Party and National affiliate | | Votes | % | Seats |
|---|---|---|---|---|
| Democratic Party | Christian Democratic Appeal | 366 | 100.00 | 5 |
| Total | | 366 | 100.00 | 5 |
| Valid votes | | 366 | 97.86 | |
| Invalid/blank votes | | 8 | 2.14 | |
| Total votes | | 374 | 100.00 | |
| Registered voters/turnout | | 1,864 | 20.06 | |
Source: Kiesraad

== See also ==
- 2019 Dutch Senate election
