= 2023 Dutch island council elections =

← 2019 ← 2020	15 March 2023	2027 →
- All 19 seats in the island councils of Bonaire (9), Saba (5) and Sint Eustatius (5)
Party	Leader	Vote %	Seats	+/–
Elected in Bonaire
PDB	Clark Abraham	38.85	3	0
UPB	James Kroon	28.42	3	+1
MPB	Hennyson Thielman	19.88	2	−2
M21	Daisy Coffie	9.63	1	New
(Saba (island)) Elected in Saba
WIPM	Bruce Zagers	59.33	3	−2
PEP	Saskia Matthew	31.15	2	New
Elected in Sint Eustatius
PLP	Rechelline Leerdam	55.66	3	0
DP	Raquel Spanner-Carty	37.69	2	0
This lists parties that won seats. See the complete results below.

Island council elections were held in the Caribbean Netherlands on 15 March 2023 to elect the members of the island councils of Bonaire, Saba and Sint Eustatius. The elections were held on the same day as the 2023 electoral college elections, and the 2023 provincial and water board elections in the European Netherlands.

== Participating parties ==
=== Bonaire ===
List	Party		Lead candidate
1	Bonaire People's Movement	MPB	Hennyson Thielman
2	Bonaire Democratic Party (Demokrat)	PDB	Clark Abraham
3	Bonaire Patriotic Union	UPB	James Kroon
4	1 Union for the People	1UPP	Aljano Emerenciana
5	Movement 21	M21	Daisy Coffie
6	Bonaire Revolution Union	URB	Suzy Thodé

=== Saba ===
List	Party		Lead candidate
1	Windward Islands People's Movement	WIPM	Bruce Zagers
2	Party for Progress, Equality and Prosperity	PEP	Saskia Matthew
3	Saba Caring People Party	SCPP	Enrico Klaber
4	Blank list (United People Movement)	UPM	Dave Levenstone

=== Sint Eustatius ===
List	Party		Lead candidate
1	Progressive Labour Party	PLP	Rechelline Leerdam
2	Democratic Party of Sint Eustatius	DP	Raquel Spanner-Carty
3	Christian Democratic Appeal	CDA	Sjahairah Fleming

== Results ==
=== Bonaire ===
Party	Votes	%	Seats	+/–
Bonaire Democratic Party	3,975	38.85	3	0
Bonaire Patriotic Union	2,908	28.42	3	+1
Bonaire People's Movement	2,034	19.88	2	−2
Movement 21	985	9.63	1	New
1 Union for the People	268	2.62	0	0
Bonaire Revolution Union	62	0.61	0	0
Total	10,232	100.00	9	0
Valid votes	10,232	97.23		
Invalid votes	174	1.65		
Blank votes	118	1.12		
Total votes	10,524	100.00		
Registered voters/turnout	16,315	64.51		
Source: Bonaire Stemt

=== Saba ===
Party	Votes	%	Seats	+/–
Windward Islands People's Movement	617	59.33	3	−2
Party for Progress, Equality and Prosperity	324	31.15	2	New
List 4 (United People Movement)	95	9.13	0	New
Saba Caring People Party	4	0.38	0	New
Total	1,040	100.00	5	0
Valid votes	1,040	98.86		
Invalid votes	5	0.48		
Blank votes	7	0.67		
Total votes	1,052	100.00		
Registered voters/turnout	1,259	83.56		
Source: Public Entity Saba

=== Sint Eustatius ===
Party	Votes	%	Seats	+/–
Progressive Labour Party	979	55.66	3	0
Democratic Party of Sint Eustatius	663	37.69	2	0
Christian Democratic Appeal	117	6.65	0	New
Total	1,759	100.00	5	0
Valid votes	1,759	99.10		
Invalid votes	14	0.79		
Blank votes	2	0.11		
Total votes	1,775	100.00		
Registered voters/turnout	2,201	80.65		
Source: Government of St. Eustatius
