= 2023 Dutch electoral college elections =

← 2019	15 March 2023	2027 →
- All 44 seats in the electoral colleges for expatriates (25), Bonaire (9), Saba (5) and Sint Eustatius (5)
Party	Leader	Vote %	Seats	+/–
Elected by expatriates
GL	Iris Bos	18.48	5	New
D66	Eelco Keij	16.30	4	New
VVD	Roy van Run	14.27	4	New
JA21	Maarten Verhoeven	9.03	2	New
PvdA	Jessica Sciarone	8.38	2	New
Volt	Miranda Meijerman	7.58	2	New
PvdD	Anja Hazekamp	7.23	2	New
FvD	Bert van Gerwen	6.96	2	New
CDA	Lorenzo Essoussi	3.79	1	New
SP	Ben van Gils	3.64	1	New
Elected in Bonaire
PDB	Clark Abraham	37.15	3	0
UPB	James Kroon	26.31	2	0
MPB	Hennyson Thielman	16.78	2	−2
Indep.	Jaap Kos	10.32	1	New
M21	Daisy Coffie	9.44	1	New
(Saba (island)) Elected in Saba
WIPM	Bruce Zagers	100	5	+1
Elected in Sint Eustatius
DP	Raquel Spanner-Carty	71.15	4	−1
CDA	Sjahairah Fleming	28.85	1	New
This lists parties that won seats. See the complete results below.

Electoral college elections were held in the Netherlands on 15 March 2023 to elect the members of the electoral colleges for the Senate, who will vote on behalf of Dutch expatriates (niet-ingezetenen) and residents of the Caribbean Netherlands in the 2023 Dutch Senate election. The elections were held on the same day as the island council elections in the Caribbean Netherlands, and the provincial and water board elections in the European Netherlands.

== Results ==
=== Expatriates ===
Party	Votes	%	Seats
GroenLinks	4,853	18.48	5
Democrats 66	4,280	16.30	4
People's Party for Freedom and Democracy	3,746	14.27	4
JA21	2,371	9.03	2
Labour Party	2,200	8.38	2
Volt	1,991	7.58	2
Party for the Animals	1,898	7.23	2
Forum for Democracy	1,827	6.96	2
Christian Democratic Appeal	995	3.79	1
Socialist Party	957	3.64	1
Reformed Political Party	552	2.10	0
50PLUS	478	1.82	0
Eelco Fiole list	111	0.42	0
Total	26,259	100.00	25
Valid votes	26,259	99.30	
Invalid votes	156	0.59	
Blank votes	30	0.11	
Total votes	26,445	100.00	
Registered voters/turnout	37,455	70.60	
Source: Municipality of The Hague

=== Bonaire ===
Party	Votes	%	Seats	+/–
Bonaire Democratic Party	3,212	37.15	3	0
Bonaire Patriotic Union	2,275	26.31	2	0
Bonaire People's Movement	1,451	16.78	2	−2
Jaap Kos list	892	10.32	1	New
Movement 21	816	9.44	1	New
Total	8,646	100.00	9	0
Valid votes	8,646	96.31		
Invalid votes	110	1.23		
Blank votes	221	2.46		
Total votes	8,977	100.00		
Registered voters/turnout	14,620	61.40		
Source: Bonaire Stemt

=== Saba ===
Party	Votes	%	Seats	+/–
Windward Islands People's Movement	496	100.00	5	+1
Total	496	100.00	5	0
Valid votes	496	91.18		
Invalid votes	23	4.23		
Blank votes	25	4.60		
Total votes	544	100.00		
Source: Public Entity Saba

=== Sint Eustatius ===
Party	Votes	%	Seats	+/–
Democratic Party of Sint Eustatius	582	71.15	4	−1
Christian Democratic Appeal	236	28.85	1	New
Total	818	100.00	5	0
Valid votes	818	94.46		
Invalid votes	14	1.62		
Blank votes	34	3.93		
Total votes	866	100.00		
Registered voters/turnout	1,941	44.62		
Source: Government of St. Eustatius

== See also ==
- 2023 Dutch Senate election
