= Movement 21 (Bonaire) =

Political party in Bonaire

Movement 21 Movementu 21
- Abbreviation: M21
- Leader: Daisy Coffie
- Founder: Daisy Coffie
- Founded: 1 October 2021
- Split from: Bonaire People's Movement
- Ideology: Social liberalism Progressivism
- Political position: Centre to centre-left
- Senatorial affiliation: Labour Party
- Colors: Pink
- Island council: 1 / 9
- Electoral college: 1 / 9

Website
- www.movementu21.com

Movement 21 (Papiamentu: Movementu 21, M21) is a Dutch local political party in the special municipality of Bonaire.

== History ==
Movement 21 was founded on 1 October 2021 by independent island councillor Daisy Coffie. Coffie had been a member of the Bonaire People's Movement (MPB) group in the island council of Bonaire since the 2015 election, but left the party in September 2020 following an internal dispute.

Movement 21 describes itself as "social liberal" and "a centrist, progressive movement". The party participated in the 2023 island council election and electoral college election, winning one seat in both the island council and the electoral college for the Senate. In the run-up to the 2025 Dutch general election, the party issued an election recommendation for Volt because of its proposals that would contribute to a more equal and respectful relationship between the European and Caribbean parts of the Kingdom of the Netherlands.

== Electoral results ==
=== Island council elections ===
Year	Island council			
Year	Votes	%	Seats	+/−
2023	985	9.63	1 / 9	New

=== Electoral college elections ===
Year	Electoral college for the Senate			
Year	Votes	%	Seats	+/−
2023	816	9.44	1 / 9	New
