= Esther Bernabela =

Politician from Bonaire

Esther Bernabela is a Dutch doctor and politician who served as a member of the Island Council of Bonaire as both a member of the Bonaire Patriotic Union (UPB) and as an independent. She was a leader in the UPB before leaving the party in protest of James Kroon. She provided support for a coalition for a Bonaire People's Movement government led by Elvis Tjin Asjoe from 2016 to 2017. She operated a clinic in Bonaire until her retirement in 2022.

== Career ==
Bernabela ran a clinic in Bonaire until her retirement on 31 August 2022.

In the 2015 election Bernabela was elected to one of the nine seats of the Island Council of Bonaire as a member of the Bonaire Patriotic Union (UPB). She held a leadership position in the UPB and was one of multiple UPB leaders to leave the party in protest of James Kroon's leadership.

On 29 April 2016, Bernabela left the UPB and sat on the Island Council as an independent. In 2016, she provided support for a coalition government led by Elvis Tjin Asjoe, a member of the Bonaire People's Movement. This coalition government lasted until 2017, when Asjoe formed a new coalition with independent councillors Clark Abraham and Jeanoushka Raphaela. Asjoe ended his coalition with Bernabela and Kroon stating that he was unable to work with them.

== Political positions ==
Bernabela called for statistics on alcohol abuse to collected and published by the state. She also called for bars to be required to have signs up stating that the sale of alcohol and its consumption by minors is illegal. She supported subsidising a bus system for children.

== Works cited ==
- "Abraham now commissioner". The Daily Herald. 27 May 2017. Archived from the original on 1 July 2025.
- "Bonaire gets new coalition". The Daily Herald. 6 May 2016. Archived from the original on 1 July 2025.
- "Bonaire has a new coalition". The Daily Herald. 21 May 2017. Archived from the original on 1 July 2025.
- "Busdienst Voor Bob Op Bonaire Loopt Vast Op Oude Verordening". Antilliaans Dagblad. 12 March 2020. Archived from the original on 1 July 2025.
- "Doctor Bernabela has gone on retirement". BES Reporter. 1 September 2022. Archived from the original on 1 July 2025.
- "Eilandraadsleden Geinstalleerd". Antilliaans Dagblad. 28 March 2015. Archived from the original on 1 July 2025.
- Evertsz-Ipcedencia, Nathaly (14 January 2020). "'Cijfers en controle missen voor betere aanpak alcoholmisbruik Bonaire'". Caribisch Netwerk. Archived from the original on 1 July 2025.
- Linkels, Harald (19 December 2017). "Hevige machtsstrijd losgebarsten binnen UPB". Bonaire Nieuws. Archived from the original on 1 July 2025.
- Monna, Janita (29 April 2016). "Bonaire: UPB/PDB-coalitie op de klippen". Caribisch Netwerk. Archived from the original on 1 July 2025.
