= 2015 Dutch island council elections =

Caribbean Netherlands elections

- 18 March 2015
- All 19 seats in the island councils of Bonaire (9), Saba (5) and Sint Eustatius (5)
Party	Leader	Vote %	Seats	+/–
Elected in Bonaire
MPB	Elvis Tjin Asjoe	29.26	3	New
PDB	Clark Abraham	28.95	3	0
UPB	James Kroon	24.44	3	−1
(Saba (island)) Elected in Saba
WIPM	Rolando Wilson	57.25	3	−1
SLP	Ishmael Levenston	42.75	2	+1
Elected in Sint Eustatius
PLP	Clyde van Putten	30.44	2	+1
DP	Adelka Spanner	29.94	2	0
UPC	Reginald Zaandam	15.44	1	0
This lists parties that won seats. See the complete results below.

Island council elections were held in the Caribbean Netherlands on 18 March 2015 to elect the members of the island councils of Bonaire, Saba and Sint Eustatius. The elections were held on the same day as the provincial and water board elections in the European Netherlands. The election was won by the Movement of Bonaire People (3 seats) in Bonaire, the Windward Islands People's Movement (3 seats) in Saba, and the Progressive Labour Party (2 seats) in Sint Eustatius.

== Results ==
=== Bonaire ===
Party	Votes	%	Seats	+/–
Bonaire People's Movement	2,755	29.26	3	New
Bonaire Democratic Party	2,726	28.95	3	0
Bonaire Patriotic Union	2,301	24.44	3	−1
Party for Justice and Unity	649	6.89	0	−1
List 7	405	4.30	0	New
1 Tim Magno	365	3.88	0	New
Christian Alliance Bonaire	215	2.28	0	New
Total	9,416	100.00	9	0
Valid votes	9,416	97.76		
Invalid/blank votes	216	2.24		
Total votes	9,632	100.00		
Registered voters/turnout	12,372	77.85		
Source: Kiesraad

=== Saba ===
Party	Votes	%	Seats	+/–
Windward Islands People's Movement	545	57.25	3	−1
Saba Labour Party	407	42.75	2	+1
Total	952	100.00	5	0
Valid votes	952	98.55		
Invalid/blank votes	14	1.45		
Total votes	966	100.00		
Registered voters/turnout	1,058	91.30		
Source: The Daily Herald

=== Sint Eustatius ===
Party	Votes	%	Seats	+/–
Progressive Labour Party	481	30.44	2	+1
Democratic Party	473	29.94	2	0
United People's Coalition	244	15.44	1	0
List 6	182	11.52	0	New
St. Eustatius Empowerment Party	134	8.48	0	−1
Statia's Liberal Action Movement	66	4.18	0	New
Total	1,580	100.00	5	0
Valid votes	1,580	99.12		
Invalid/blank votes	14	0.88		
Total votes	1,594	100.00		
Registered voters/turnout	2,435	65.46		
Source: Kiesraad
