= Second De Jongh-Elhage cabinet =

- 27th Cabinet of the Netherlands Antilles

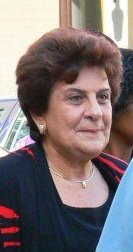
- Date formed: 26 March 2010
- Date dissolved: 10 October 2010

People and organisations
- Head of state: Beatrix of the Netherlands
- Head of government: Emily de Jongh-Elhage

History
- Election: 2010 election
- Predecessor: De Jongh-Elhage I

The second De Jongh-Elhage cabinet was the 27th and last cabinet of the Netherlands Antilles.

== Composition ==
The cabinet was composed as follows:

Main office-holders
Office	Name	Party	Since
Minister of General Affairs and Foreign Affairs	Emily de Jongh-Elhage	PAR	26 March 2010
Minister of the Interior and Constitutional Affairs	Roland Duncan	NA	26 March 2010
Minister of Justice	Magali Jacoba	PAR	26 March 2010
Minister of Labor and Economic Affairs	Elvis Tjin Asjoe	UPB	26 March 2010
Minister of Education, Youth, Culture, and Sports	Omayra Leeflang	PAR	26 March 2010
Minister of Public Health and Social Development	Omayra Leeflang	PAR	26 March 2010
Minister of Traffic and Communications	Patrick Illidge	NA	26 March 2010
Minister of Finance	Ersilia de Lannooy	PAR^{[Note]}	26 March 2010
State Secretary of Constitutional Affairs and the Solidarity Fund	Shamara Nicholson-Linzey	WIPM	26 March 2010
State Secretary of the Interior	Felix Thomas	UPB	26 March 2010
State Secretary of Justice: Police Affairs; Penitentiary Windward Islands	Ernie Simmons	DP-ste	26 March 2010
State Secretary of Justice: Youth Correctional Facility; Court of Guardianship; Rehabilitation Foundation	Dudley Lucia	PNP	10 June 2010

^{Note} Ersilia de Lannooy stayed on as Minister of Finance for the PAR party at the request of that party's leader Prime Minister Emily de Jongh-Elhage, after PNP earned only one seat in the 2010 parliamentary election and was forced to accept a state secretary position in the central government.
