= First De Jongh-Elhage cabinet =

- 26th Cabinet of the Netherlands Antilles

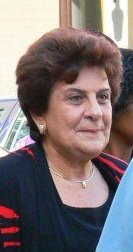
- Date formed: 26 March 2006
- Date dissolved: 26 March 2010

People and organisations
- Head of state: Beatrix of the Netherlands
- Head of government: Emily de Jongh-Elhage

History
- Outgoing election: 2010 election
- Predecessor: Ys II
- Successor: De Jongh-Elhage II

The first De Jongh-Elhage cabinet was the 26th cabinet of the Netherlands Antilles.

== Composition ==
The cabinet was composed as follows:

Main office-holders
Office	Name	Party	Since
Minister of General Affairs and Foreign Affairs	Emily de Jongh-Elhage	PAR	26 March 2006
Minister of the Interior and Constitutional Affairs	Roland Duncan	NA	26 March 2006
Minister of Education, Youth, Culture, and Sports	Omayra Leeflang	PAR	26 March 2006
Minister of Finance	Ersilia de Lannooy	PNP	26 March 2006
Minister of Justice	David Dick	PAR	26 March 2006
Minister of Justice	Magali Jacoba	PAR	14 August 2009
Minister of Public Health and Social Development	Sandra E. Smith	MAN	26 March 2006
Minister of Public Health and Social Development	Ersilia de Lannooy	PNP	6 December 2006
Minister of Public Health and Social Development	Omayra Leeflang	PAR	4 June 2007
Minister of Traffic and Communications	Kenneth A. Gijsbertha	MAN	26 March 2006
Minister of Traffic and Communications	Omayra Leeflang	PAR	6 December 2006
Minister of Traffic and Communications	Maurice Adriaens	FOL	2007
Minister of Labor and Economic Affairs	Burney Elhage	UPB	26 March 2006
Minister of Labor and Economic Affairs	Elvis Tjin Asjoe	UPB	13 July 2007
Minister of Labor and Economic Affairs	Hubert Martis	UPB	19 March 2009
State Secretary of Justice	Ernie Simmons	DP-ste	26 March 2006
State Secretary of Finance	Alex Rosaria	PNP	26 March 2006
State Secretary of the Solidarity Fund	Shamara Nicholson-Linzey	WIPM	26 March 2006
State Secretary of Traffic and Communications: Meteorological Service and Aviation	Julio G. Constancia	FOL	10 July 2009
State Secretary of the Interior and Constitutional Affairs	Hubert Martis	UPB	26 March 2006
State Secretary of the Interior and Constitutional Affairs	Noris Gomes	UPB	19 March 2009
State Secretary of Public Health	Rodolphe Samuel	NA	26 March 2006
State Secretary of Public Health	Joan Smart-Berkle	NA	2007
State Secretary of Public Health	George Pantophlet	NA	7 January 2009
State Secretary of Public Health	Patrick Illidge	NA	10 July 2009
