= Nina den Heyer =

Dutch politician

Nina Seline den Heyer (born 1978) is a Dutch politician and a member of the Executive Council of Bonaire since 2023. She previously served on the Executive Council in 2016–2018 and 2019–2022. She won the most votes in the 2019 elections, the first woman in history to do so.

== Biography ==
Nina den Heyer was born in Curaçao to a Bonairean mother and a Dutch father. She moved to the Netherlands at age 19, where she studied at Leiden University.

In late 2004, den Heyer moved to Bonaire. She worked there as a policy advisor to the Executive Council of Bonaire from 2005 to 2011. In 2011 she became the head of the National Office of the Caribbean Netherlands' unit for social affairs and unemployment.

She obtained a master's degree in social work from the University of Curaçao in 2013.

Den Heyer joined the Movement of Bonaire People (MPB) party under the leadership of Elvis Tjin Asjoe. She briefly took office in 2016 as a member of the Island Council, then in May of that year she was named to the Executive Council. After a coalition with the Bonaire Patriotic Union (UPB) collapsed in May 2017, the MPB joined with two other factions to remain in power. Den Heyer stayed on in the shuffle but took on a new portfolio of social affairs, education, culture, public health, and youth. She then resigned in September 2018 when it became clear that the coalition could no longer count on majority support.

In the 2019 general elections on March 20, den Heyer ran as the No. 2 candidate on the MPB list. She campaigned on the themes of poverty reduction and helping children and the elderly. She received 1,092 preference votes, higher than the party leaders of all parties including her own. On April 8, 2019, as part of a new MPB-UPB coalition, she became the councilor in charge of social and welfare issues on the Executive Council.

In November 2022, she left the Executive Council to take up an appointment as head of Education, Culture, and Science in the Caribbean Netherlands. A year later, in late October 2023, she returned to the Executive Council as a sectoral commissioner, serving independently of any party. Her portfolio includes health and education, among other issues.
