= Monique Wilson (politician) =

Saban politician

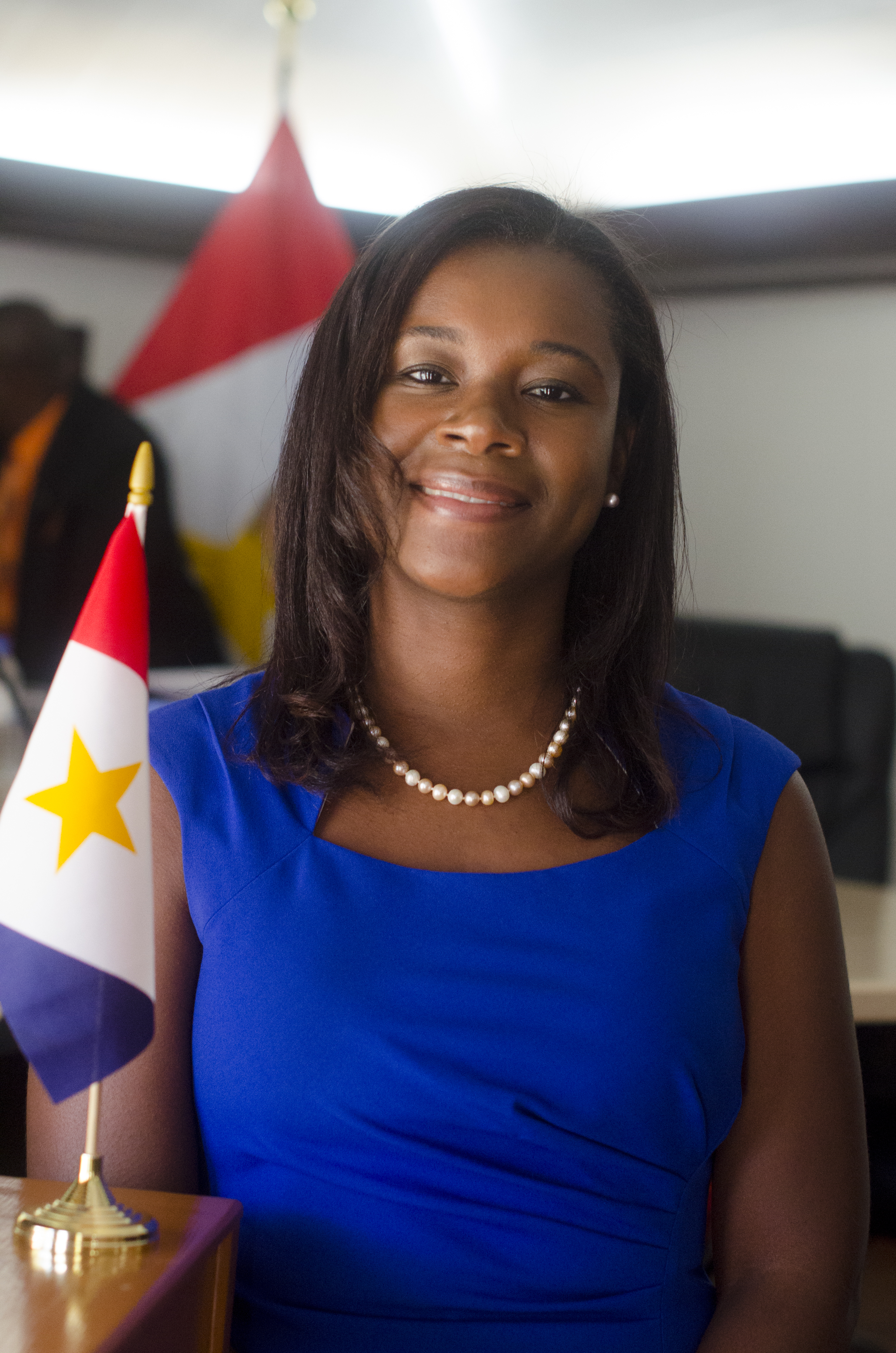
- Monique Wilson in 2015

Member of the Saban Island council
- In office 26 March 2015 – 28 March 2019

Personal details
- Party: Saba Labour Party

Monique Wilson is a Saban politician. She served as a member of the Saba Island Council for the Saba Labour Party between 2015 and 2019.

== Career ==
Wilson was a candidate for the Saba Labour Party in the 2015 Island Council elections, in which she was elected after receiving 121 votes from the around a thousand possible voters. This was the first time she had stood for election. Out of the 18 people standing for election, Wilson placed third, and the highest for her party. As a result of the election, she took one of the two SLP seats on the Island Council in opposition to the Windward Islands People's Movement party who held three. She was the only woman elected to the council, and succeeded WIPM candidate Amelia Nicholson.

In 2016, she was part of the official delegation who visited the government of Saint Kitts and Nevis to promote cooperation between the two island nations. The following year, she spoke of how the Saba government needs to do more to encourage the skills of school leavers so that they may contribute greater to the local economy. She also stresses the need for the Saban youth to learn Dutch. Outside of her work with the government, Wilson is also a social worker and family guardian.

The 2019 elections saw Wilson lose her seat, with the SLP losing its representation in the Island Council.
