= 2006 Netherlands Antilles general election =

2006 general election in the Netherlands

General elections were held in the Netherlands Antilles on 27 January 2006. The result was a highly fragmented Estates, with no party winning more than five seats.

== Results ==
Party	Island	Votes	%	Seats
Party for the Restructured Antilles	Curaçao	18,187	20.39	5
New Antilles Movement	Curaçao	13,123	14.71	3
Workers' Liberation Front	Curaçao	9,582	10.74	2
National People's Party	Curaçao	7,768	8.71	2
Forsa Kòrsou	Curaçao	6,658	7.47	2
National Alliance	Sint Maarten	4,301	4.82	2
People's Crusade Labour Party	Curaçao	4,293	4.81	0
Democratic Party Sint Maarten	Sint Maarten	4,122	4.62	1
Lista Niun Paso Atras	Curaçao	3,851	4.32	0
Bonaire Patriotic Union	Bonaire	3,678	4.12	2
Sovereign People	Curaçao	3,357	3.76	0
PDB–Paboso–ON	Bonaire	2,947	3.30	1
Democratic Party	Curaçao	2,638	2.96	0
People's Progressive Alliance	Sint Maarten	1,712	1.92	0
Ban Vota	Curaçao	484	0.54	0
Democratic Party	Sint Eustatius	445	0.50	1
Progressive Labour Party	Sint Eustatius	377	0.42	0
Windward Islands People's Movement	Saba	374	0.42	1
Sint Maarten People's Party	Sint Maarten	254	0.28	0
Movementu Opshon D	Curaçao	242	0.27	0
Saba Labour Party	Saba	221	0.25	0
Partido Akshon pa Prosperidat Permanente i Seguridat	Curaçao	185	0.21	0
Sint Eustatius Alliance	Sint Eustatius	130	0.15	0
P100	Curaçao	99	0.11	0
United People's Labour Party	Sint Maarten	75	0.08	0
E Mayoria Opshon D-C	Curaçao	41	0.05	0
Freedom	Sint Maarten	38	0.04	0
Total		89,182	100.00	22
Source: CBS, e-Polityka
