= Adelka Spanner =

Sint Eustatian politician

Frini Eveline Adelka Spanner (born 25 September 1958 Sint Eustatius) is a Sint Eustatian politician and former member of the Island Council for the Democratic Party. She became vice-chair of the Council following the 2020 Sint Eustatius general election and in 2021 received a royal decoration to mark her 33 year-political career and charity work. She was replaced as leader of the Democratic Party by party election in 2022 and failed to win a seat in the 2023 elections to the Island Council.

== Early life ==
Spanner was born on Sint Eustatius, which was then part of the former Netherlands Antilles, on 25 September 1958. She has worked in the island's public administration.

== Political career ==
Adelka Spanner won re-election to the five-member Island Council in the 2020 Sint Eustatius general election. She was one of two members of the Democratic Party elected to the council in 2020 (alongside Nicolaas “Koos” Sneek), while three seats were won by the governing Progressive Labour Party. Spanner and the other members were inaugurated on 29 October 2020. Spanner was appointed Vice Chairperson of the council's Central Committee during the term.

Sneek left the Democratic Party on 30 October to sit as an independent member of the council. He stated that his decision was over a difference of opinion with Spanner over the party's performance in the 2020 election and the decision to nominate Spanner as vice-chair instead of him. In November 2021 Spanner indicated that she would seek to end proxy voting in Sint Eustatius which she saw as open to abuse. Some 38% of votes cast in the 2020 election had been by proxy.

On 26 April 2021 Spanner was one of seven Statia residents to receive a 2021 Royal Decoration on behalf of King Willem-Alexander of the Netherlands. Spanner received the decoration in recognition of her 33 years of political service and for her charitable and community work. In May 2022 Spanner condemned a letter signed by other members of the council, on council letterpaper, and addressed to the Parliament of St. Maarten. She said this contravened a law that required documents from the council to be signed by the governor and the registrar rather than members.

Spanner was replaced as leader of the Democratic Party by Raquel Spanner-Carty, following elections held on 18 July 2022. Spanner failed to win a seat on the council in the 2023 elections. The Democratic Party won two seats which went to Spanner-Carty and Mercedes Lopes-Spanner. Spanner, who was chair of the credentials committee, again criticised the large number of proxy votes and said there were indications that the system was being abused but that this was not sufficient to invalidate the election.
