= Island Council of Saba =

Legislative body of the Dutch special municipality

Coordinates: 17°37′34.5″N 63°14′55.5″W

Type
- Type: Island council

Leadership
- Chairman: Jocelyn Levenstone since 1 July 2026

Structure
- Seats: 5
- Political groups: WIPM (3)
- Political groups: PEP (2)
- Length of term: 4 years

Elections
- Last election: 15 March 2023
- Next election: 2027

Meeting place
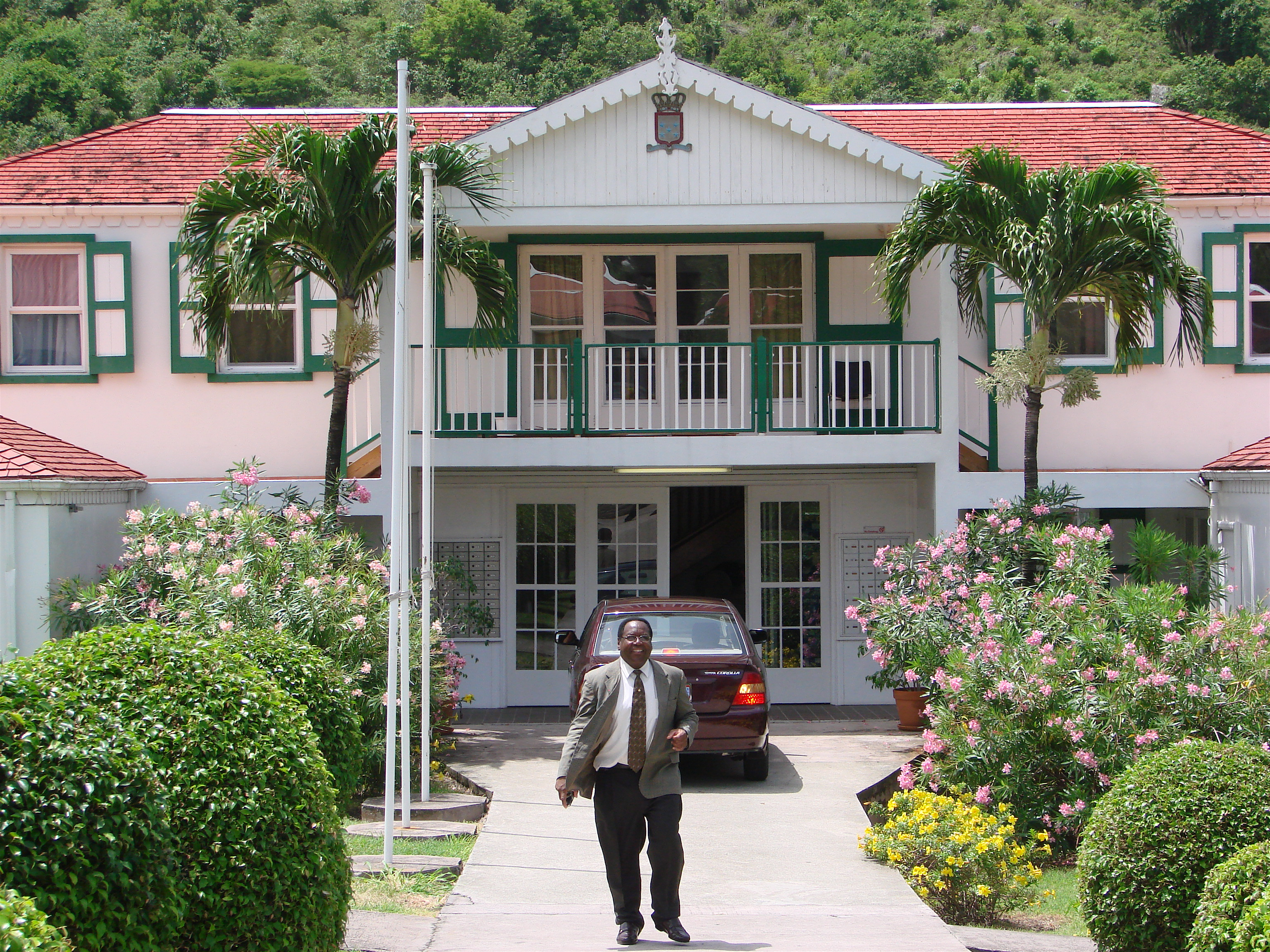
- Government Building, The Bottom

Website
- www.sabagov.nl

The Island Council of Saba is the legislative body of the Dutch special municipality of Saba. It consists of five members and elections take place every four years. The Island Council appoints and supervises the commissioners in the Executive Council. The Island Council is chaired by the Island Governor.

== Composition ==
=== Current members ===
Currently there are two political parties represented in the Island Council: The Windward Islands People's Movement (WIPM) holds three seats and the Party for Progress, Equality and Prosperity (PEP) holds two seats.

Portrait	Member	Party	First took office
	Rolando Wilson	Windward Islands People's Movement	2003
	Vito Charles	Windward Islands People's Movement	2016
	Elsa Peterson	Windward Islands People's Movement	2023
	Saskia Matthew	Party for Progress, Equality and Prosperity	2023
	Julio Every	Party for Progress, Equality and Prosperity	2023

=== Former Members ===
Starting in 1951, five Island Council members were elected at large. Members of the council, from 1951 to the present, are:

Year	Island Council Members				
1951	John Herman Hassell	David Lionel Henry Donker	Lamber Hassell	John Esmond Mathew Levenstone	Kenneth Peterson
	John Herman Hassell	David Lionel Henry Donker	Lamber Hassell	John Esmond Mathew Levenstone	Cornelia Rosina Jones
1955	John Arthur Anslyn	David Lionel Henry Donker	John William Johnson	John Esmond Mathew Levenstone	Eugenius Achilas Johnson
1959	John Arthur Anslyn	Samuel Wilson Jr.	Richard Dudley Johnson	John Esmond Mathew Levenstone	Eric Milton Johnson
1963	John Arthur Anslyn	Peter Leicester Granger	Henry Earl Johnson	John Esmond Mathew Levenstone	Maximilaan Willem Nicholson
1967	John Arthur Anslyn	Peter Leicester Granger	John Godfrey Woods	Eugenius Achilas Johnson	Maximilaan Willem Nicholson
	John Arthur Anslyn	Peter Leicester Granger	John Godfrey Woods	Calvin Holm	Maximilaan Willem Nicholson
1971	John Esmond Mathew Levenstone	Peter Leicester Granger	John Godfrey Woods	Calvin Holm	Maximilaan Willem Nicholson
1975	William Stanley Johnson	Peter Leicester Granger	Eddison Melvyn Peterson	Calvin Holm	Ishmael Mathew Amael Levenston
1979	William Stanley Johnson	Peter Leicester Granger	Ray Hassell	Christian Richard Alexander Sorton	David Mac Clean Johnson
1983	William Stanley Johnson	Peter Leicester Granger	Vernon Raphael Hassell	Ishmael Mathew Amael Levenston	Hugo Levenstone
1987	William Stanley Johnson	Peter Leicester Granger	Vernon Raphael Hassell	Ramon Adolphus Hassell	Elmer Wycliffe Linzey
1991	William Stanley Johnson	Steve Hassell	Roy Smith	George Leonard Hassell	Elmer Wycliffe Linzey
	William Stanley Johnson	Steve Hassell	Roy Smith	Calvin Holm	Elmer Wycliffe Linzey
1995	Ramon Adolphus Hassell	Steve Hassell	Roy Smith	Christina ten Brink-Charles	Ray Hassell
1999	William Stanley Johnson	Lisa Hassell	Eric Adrel Linzey	Ishmael Mathew Amael Levenston	Ray Hassell
2003	William Stanley Johnson	Lisa Hassell	Rolando Ricardo Wilson	Steve Hassell	Lucia Woods
2007	Chris Johnson	Bruce Zagers	Rolando Ricardo Wilson	Carl Buncamper	Akilah Levenstone
2011	Ishmael Mathew Amael Levenston	Shamara Nicholson-Linzey	Rolando Ricardo Wilson	Carl Buncamper	Eviton Heyliger
2015	Ishmael Mathew Amael Levenston	Monique Wilson	Rolando Ricardo Wilson	Carl Buncamper	Eviton Heyliger
	Ishmael Mathew Amael Levenston	Monique Wilson	Vito Charles	Carl Buncamper	Eviton Heyliger
2019	Hemmie van Xanten	Esmeralda Johnson	Vito Charles	Carl Buncamper	Eviton Heyliger
2023	Hemmie van Xanten	Saskia Matthew	Vito Charles	Elsa Peterson	Rolando Ricardo Wilson

== See also ==
- Municipality of the Netherlands
- Island council (Netherlands)
- Island council (Netherlands Antilles)
