= Marugia Janga =

Dutch politician and activist

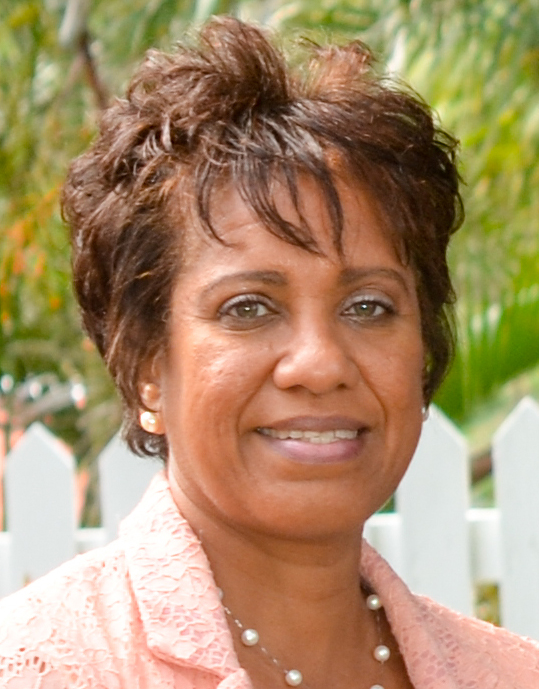

Member of the Island Council of Bonaire
- Parliamentary group: Frente Sosial Progresivo

Personal details
- Citizenship: Bonaire

Marugia Janga is a Dutch politician and activist in the special municipality of Bonaire.

== Politics ==
In 2009, Janga served as a signatory to protocols which designated an 8 million euro fund to be established for the restoration of monuments in the Netherlands Antilles and Aruba from the Netherlands. The fund was set up in the form of low interest loans to private owners of local monuments to fund their upkeep.

In 2016, Janga was a member of the Partido Demokratiko Boneriano, the Democratic Party of the island municipality. As a member of that party, she served on Bonaire's Island Council. However, in 2017, citing disagreements with the party, Janga and two other board members split with the Democratic Party and formed their own faction. Working most closely with Robby Beukenboom but also Michael Pieters, Janga helped to create a new coalition.

Janga would be a member of this new coalition, the Frente Sosial Progresivo party, in the next elections, running second on their list of candidates.

== Activism ==
Janga is a project manager of the humanitarian aid group Caritas Willemstad, which is primarily concerned with assisting Venezuelan migrants in Bonaire. The group coordinates with local churches to provide aid and sanctuary to migrants, which is not provided by the island's government.
