= 2010 Netherlands Antilles general election =

2010 general election in the Netherlands

General elections were held in the Netherlands Antilles on 22 January 2010. Voters elected the 22 members of the Estates, or parliament, of the Netherlands Antilles. It has been the country's last general election, as the Netherlands Antilles have ceased to exist as a country within the Kingdom of the Netherlands on 10 October 2010. At the time of the elections, the Netherlands Antilles consisted of the Caribbean islands of Bonaire, Curaçao, Saba, Sint Eustatius and Sint Maarten.

== Background ==
The Council of Ministers of the Netherlands Antilles announced on 16 September 2009, that it had chosen 22 January 2010 as the official date for the upcoming general election. Voter registration for the election ended in November 2009. Antillean political parties who wish to contest the election must submit their list of candidates by the first week of December 2009.

There was some disagreement among politicians in the Netherlands Antilles as to the exact date of the upcoming election. Some politicians, including the Minister of Constitutional Affairs Roland Duncan, advocated an election date of 29 January 2010, instead. However, the 29 January date was ultimately rejected because the annual Tumba Festival also takes place on Curaçao on that date.

Glenn Sulvaran of the Curaçao based Party for the Restructured Antilles (PAR) argued against the original proposed 29 January date, noting that elections are not held during the carnival season on Sint Maarten or other islands, so the general election should not conflict with the Tumba Festival. Minister of Constitutional Affairs Roland Duncan rejected that argument, noting that the festival could be rescheduled for an event as important as a general election. Duncan criticized the perception that Curaçao's interests dominated those of other islands in the Netherlands Antilles, "Sometimes I have to wonder how serious we are. This is a prime example of how much of a farce the Netherlands Antilles is. What is best for Curaçao automatically has to be best for the other islands as well."

A date of 22 January 2010, was ultimately agreed upon by the Council of Ministers.

== Results ==
On Curaçao, the PAR won the most seats, and were expected to form the next government.

Party	Island	Votes	%	Seats
Party for the Restructured Antilles	Curaçao	26,641		6
List of Change (MAN–FK–LNPA)	Curaçao	23,552		5
Sovereign People	Curaçao	10,789		2
National Alliance	Sint Maarten	6,939		3
National People's Party	Curaçao	6,494		1
Workers' Liberation Front	Curaçao	4,373		0
Bonaire Patriotic Union	Bonaire	3,673		2
Democratic Party Sint Maarten	Sint Maarten	3,560		0
Bonaire Democratic Party	Bonaire	2,720		1
Democratic Party	Curaçao	1,815		0
List of Change	Bonaire	1,126		0
People's Progressive Alliance	Sint Maarten	916		0
Democratic Party	Sint Eustatius	602		1
Windward Islands People's Movement	Saba	393		1
Progressive Labour Party	Sint Eustatius	341		0
Party for an Emancipated People	Curaçao	311		0
Movement Opposing Isla Refinery	Curaçao	195		0
Total				22
Source: Amigoe Bonaire Reporter, St. Maarten Island Time
