= Andalusi Party =

Andalusi Party Partido Andalusí
- Abbreviation: PA
- Leader: Dris Mohamed
- Founded: March 2023; 3 years ago
- Preceded by: Renaissance and Union of Europe Party (PRUNE)
- Headquarters: Algeciras
- Ideology: Andalusian nationalism Religious humanism Spanish Moroccan interests
- Religion: Islam
- European political alliance: Free Palestine Party
- Colours: Blue; Green
- Congress of Deputies: 0 / 61
- Senate: 0 / 32
- Parliament of Andalusia: 0 / 109

Website
- partidoandalusi.wordpress.com

The Andalusi Party (Spanish: Partido Andalusí) is a Spanish political party. Established in Algeciras in 2023 by Dris Mohamed, the party is inspired by the Andalusian nationalism of Blas Infante and defines its ideology as "Islamic humanism". Its proposals include co-official status for Arabic in Andalusia, and the integration of Ceuta, Melilla, and the Canary Islands to the region. It is part of the Free Palestine Party, a European political alliance.

== History ==
The Andalusi Party was launched in March 2023 in Algeciras in the Province of Cádiz, by Dris Mohamed, president of the Spanish Federation of Islamic Religious Entities (FEERI) in the Campo de Gibraltar. Dris Mohamed said that the party would contest the 2023 Spanish local elections. Mohamed had previously led the Renaissance and Union of Europe Party (PRUNE), also of Islamic influence; in the 2019 local elections it gained 115 votes in Algeciras, far short of the estimated 2,200 for a seat on the council.

In the 2023 local elections, the party ran in Algeciras. Its programme included protecting rights of minorities, combatting hate speech, constructing an Islamic cemetery, aid for unplanned pregnancies, countering radicalisation, and ensuring that public works be done by local companies and workers. The party achieved 320 votes (0.74%), the lowest of the seven competing lists. El Confidencial noted the growing number of Muslims as candidates in Spanish elections, but the failure of Islamic parties.

In November 2023, the Andalusi Party met with representatives of other Islamic parties, led by the Union of French Muslim Democrats, with the intention of forming a European political party for the 2024 European Parliament election. Together, they set up the Free Palestine Party, a European political alliance, in 2024.

In the 2026 Andalusian regional election, the party stood only in the Cádiz constituency. It came last of 16 lists with 592 votes, or 0.1%.

== Ideology ==
The party claims inspiration from Andalusian nationalist Blas Infante, whose grandson Alejandro Delmás Infante was a founding member. It defines its ideology as "Islamic humanism". The party highlights an Andalusi identity that neither Spanish nor Moroccan, but that it says has been appropriated by Morocco. The party demands that Spain grant citizenship to the descendants of the Moriscos who were expelled from Spain.

Ali Raisuni, an advisor to King Mohammed VI of Morocco, is also a close contact of Dris Mohamed. The party says that Spanish is the official language of Andalusia and Arabic is its historical language. The party proposes that the autonomous cities of Ceuta and Melilla are returned to Andalusia; Dris Mohamed mentioned he was born in Ceuta in 1977 when it was part of Andalusia. He told El Mundo in 2026 that he wished to make the Canary Islands part of Andalusia as well, which would be unprecedented. He told Infobae that his party is not separatist and opposes all separatism, characterising the Western Sahara as fully Moroccan.

== See also ==
- Andalusian Liberation – 1980s party with the goal of creating an independent Islamic Andalusia
