= 2020 Sint Eustatius island council election =

- 21 October 2020

5 seats in the Island council
	First party	Second party
	PLP	DP
Leader	Rechelline Leerdam	Adelka Spanner
Party	PLP	DP
Last election	30.44%, 2 seats	29.94%, 2 seats
Seats before	2	2
Seats won	3	2
Seat change	▲1	Steady
Popular vote	815	647
Percentage	51.39%	40.79%
Leader of Government before election
Clyde van Putten
Progressive Labour Party
Elected Leader of Government
TBD

Island Council elections were held in Sint Eustatius on 21 October 2020. Sint Eustatius is a special municipality (officially "public body") of the Netherlands. The elections were originally to be held on 20 March 2019, but were postponed due to administrative intervention by the Dutch government. On 23 September 2019, a new election date was announced.

Since 2015 foreign nationals also have the right to vote and to stand as a candidate if they are 18 years of age, reside lawfully on Bonaire, Sint Eustatius or Saba on the day of nomination, and have been a resident of the Netherlands or legally resided there immediately prior to that day for an uninterrupted period of at least five years.

The Progressive Labour Party, led by Rechelline Leerdam, won three seats on Island Council to form the governing majority, while the Democratic Party, led by Adelka Spanner, won the remaining two seats. The new Island Council members were inaugurated on 29 October.

== Schedule ==
The timetable for these elections is as follows:

Date	action
29 July 2020	Last day for batch registration
7 September 2020	Day of nomination
21 October 2020	Day of voting
23 October 2020	Announcement of the final result

== Contesting parties ==
Party	Position	Ideology	Leader (since)	Last election	At dissolution	Contesting
Progressive Labour Party	Centre-left		Rechelline Leerdam (July 2020)	2 / 5 (40%)	2 / 5 (40%)	Yes
Democratic Party	Centre	Christian democracy	Adelka Spanner (August 2013)	2 / 5 (40%)	2 / 5 (40%)	Yes
United People's Coalition	Centre		Elvin Henriquez (July 2020)	1 / 5 (20%)	0 / 5 (0%)	Yes

== Incumbent legislature ==
In the 2015 elections, the Progressive Labour Party and Democratic Party won two seats each, with the United People's Coalition taking one seat. Turnout was 65.46%, with 1,594 out of 2,135 eligible voters taking part. There were 6 blank ballots and 8 invalid ballots. The incumbent coalition was between the PLP and UPC.

Incumbent Council Members
#	2015 election	
#	Island Council Member	Votes
1	Clyde van Putten	251
2	Adelka Spanner	150
3	Koos Sneek	135
4	Reginald Zaandam	67
5	Astrid McKenzie-Tatem	58

== Results ==
Party	Votes	%	Seats	+/–
Progressive Labour Party	815	51.39	3	+1
Democratic Party	647	40.79	2	0
United People's Coalition	124	7.82	0	–1
Total	1,586	100.00	5	0
Valid votes	1,586	98.14		
Invalid/blank votes	30	1.86		
Total votes	1,616	100.00		
Registered voters/turnout	2,102	76.88		
