= Free Palestine Party =

Pro-Palestine European political alliance

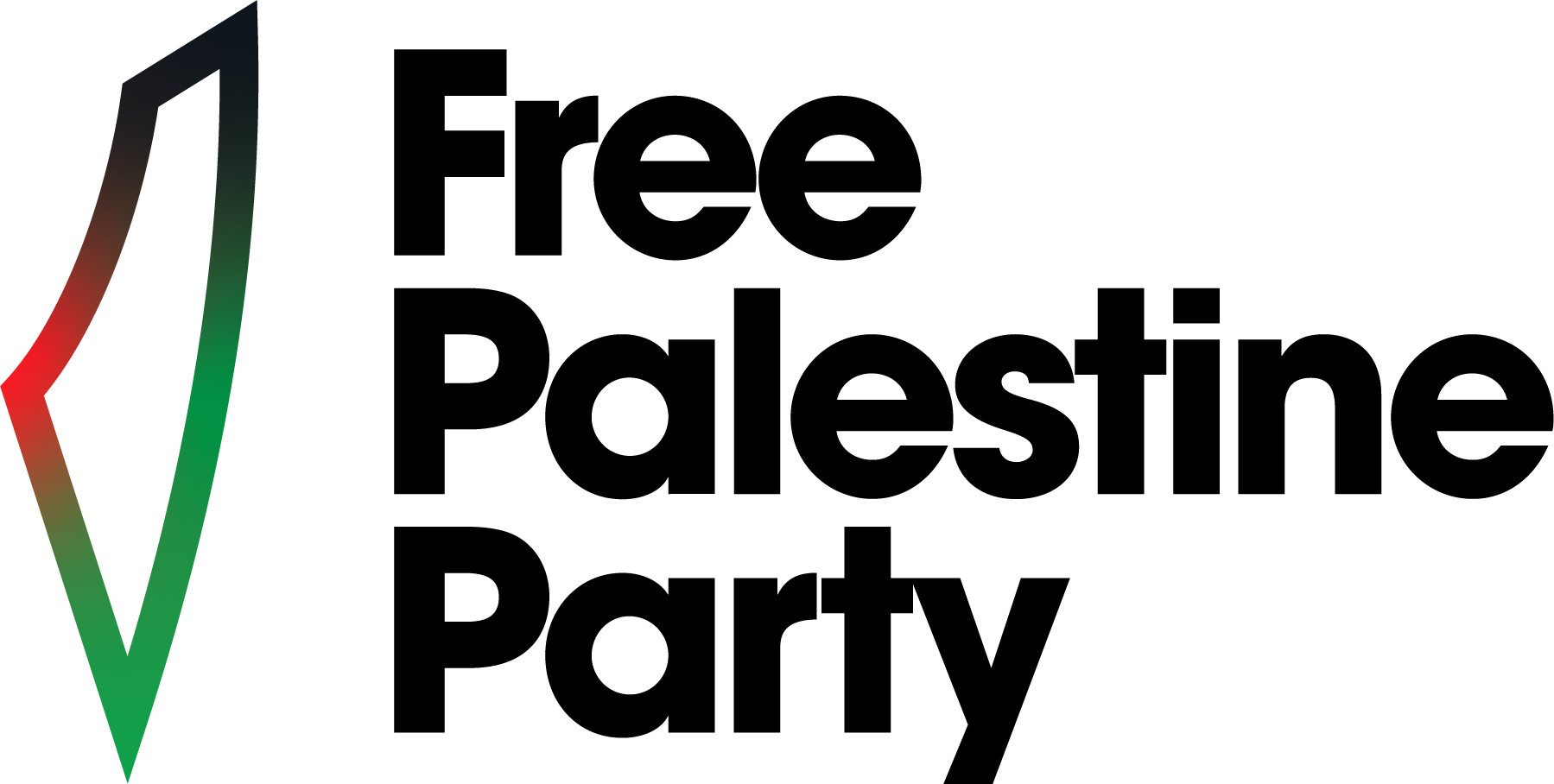
- Abbreviation: FPP
- Founded: 19 March 2024
- Ideology: Muslim interests Anti-Zionism
- Colours: Orange (main); Palestine flag colors
- European Parliament: 0 / 720 (0%)
- European Lower Houses: 0 / 6,217 (0%)
- European Upper Houses: 0 / 1,459 (0%)

Website
- freepalestineparty.com

The Free Palestine Party (FPP) is a European political alliance founded by pro-Palestinian Muslim minority parties in Belgium, France, Germany, Netherlands, Spain and Sweden. These parties participated in the 2024 European parliament election under the Free Palestine slogan.

== Ideology ==
The declared goal of the Free Palestine Party is to raise awareness of the consequences of the Gaza war and call on the European Union to take more decisive action against Israel. The Free Palestine Party claims to support the idea of a two-state solution of the Israeli–Palestinian conflict. To achieve this goal, its members advocate dialogue between the various parties involved, including Hamas. In addition to the Palestinian issue, the FPP program lists proposals in the field of the environment, combating tax evasion and discrimination.

== History ==
The coalition of parties presented its program on 19 March 2024 in Brussels. Nagib Azergui, founder of the Union of French Muslim Democrats, called on Europe to "be consistent with its promises of peace on the continent and throughout the world". According to him, as Israel's largest trading partner, the EU should apply sanctions against it in order to achieve a negotiated solution to the conflict.

== Member parties ==
Country	Party	Abbr.	Ideology	Political position	Status
Belgium	Team Fouad Ahidar	TFA	Muslim interests Multiculturalism; Anti-Zionism		Extra-parliamentary
France	Union of French Muslim Democrats; Union des démocrates musulmans français	UDMF	Muslim interests Anti-imperialism; Anti-Zionism; Anti-colonialism		Extra-parliamentary
Germany	Alliance for Innovation and Justice; Bündnis für Innovation und Gerechtigkeit	BIG	Muslim interests Political Islam; Social conservatism	Right-wing	Extra-parliamentary
Netherlands	NIDA	NIDA	Muslim interests Islamic democracy Progressivism; Anti-Zionism; Dutch Moroccan interests	Syncretic	Extra-parliamentary
Spain	Andalusi Party; Partido Andalusí	PA	Muslim interests Andalusian regionalism Spanish Moroccan interests		Extra-parliamentary
Sweden	Nuance Party; Partiet Nyans	PNy	Muslim interests Multiculturalism; Identity politics Turkophilia; Islamism	Syncretic	Extra-parliamentary

== See also ==
- Long arm of Ankara
- Gaza war protest vote movements
