= Nida (political party) =

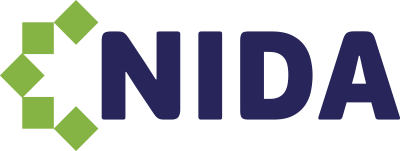
- Leader: Nourdin El Ouali
- Chairman: Nurullah Gerdan
- Founded: 2013
- Split from: GroenLinks
- Ideology: Islamic democracy; Progressivism; Anti-Zionism
- Political position: Syncretic
- Religion: Islam
- European political alliance: Free Palestine Party
- Colours: Green; Purple

Website
- nida.nl

Nida (Arabic: نداء, romanized: nidā', lit. 'call' or 'appeal'; stylised in all caps) is a political movement in the Netherlands, describing itself as "being inspired by Islam". It was founded in 2013 by Nourdin El Ouali, a former municipal councillor in Rotterdam for GroenLinks. The party is currently only represented at the municipal level, with two seats in Rotterdam and one seat in The Hague. The party shares the same electorate as Denk, mostly Islamic immigrants, although Nida is more religiously oriented. In 2021, the party announced that they would cease competing in elections and instead continue further as a social movement.

== History ==
=== 2014 municipal elections ===
The party first participated solely in Rotterdam, where it received two seats in the municipal council with 4.8% of the vote. It did not have a political programme; instead, the party promoted their plans by means of a 'political pamphlet'.

=== 2018 municipal elections ===
The party kept its two seats in Rotterdam, increasing its vote share to 5.4%. The party also expanded to The Hague, getting one seat with a vote share of 2.3%. The party initially participated in the "Leftist Covenant" with the PvdA, SP and GroenLinks, releasing a joint manifesto supporting a 'social, ecological and inclusive Rotterdam' and against Livable Rotterdam. However, the coalition collapsed over a tweet from 2014, where party leader Nourdin El Ouali compared Israel to Daesh. Nida saw no reason to distance itself from the tweet and invoked freedom of speech.

=== 2019 Provincial States elections ===
The party's first attempt to participate in national politics came in 2019, where it participated in provincial elections in North Holland and South Holland. The party did not receive any seat in the Provincial States, receiving 0.4% and 0.5% respectively.

=== 2021 general election ===
In 2021, the party participated in their first general election. Nourdin El Ouali was appointed as lead candidate. The party received 0.3% of vote share.

=== Protests and actions ===
The party received national attention in June 2014, when party members organised a solidarity march for Gazans with a reported turnout of over ten thousand people. In November 2015, the party organised a similarly large march named 'Unity in Diversity Against Terrorism', with notable guests including the mayor of Rotterdam.

As a reaction to a partial ban of face-coverings such as the burqa, resulting in people wearing less restrictive head coverings such as hijabs being fined as well, the party started a 'hijab fund' to pay incorrectly applied fines.

=== 2024 European Parliament election ===
In the 2024 European Parliament election Nida co-founded the European political alliance Free Palestine, together with pro-Palestinian Muslim minority parties in Belgium, France, Germany, Netherlands, Spain and Sweden. None of the participating parties won a single seat in the elections.
