= Esmeralda Johnson =

Saba Island politician

- Education: Lindenwood University
- Occupation: Politician
- Years active: 2019 – 2023
- Known for: Youngest ever member of the Island Council of Saba
- Political party: Windward Islands People's Movement

Esmeralda Johnson is a politician from Saba, and former member of the Saba Island Council for the Windward Islands People's Movement. She held this post since 28 March 2019 when, at age 21, she became the youngest person to serve in that capacity.

== Biography ==
Johnson graduated from Lindenwood University in 2018 with a BA in Mathematics and Economics. In 2019, aged 21 years old, Johnson ran for election to a seat on the Island Council of Saba. She was the youngest female candidate to ever take part in the Saba Island elections. She is a member of the Windward Islands People's Movement. Her campaign focused on the issues of youth empowerment, education and women's rights.

In May 2019, she was elected to a council seat with 39 votes. With her election, she became the youngest ever member of the Island Council of Saba. She is also the only female member of the current iteration of the council. Her grandfather, David Johnson was also a member of the island council; he was elected in 1979.

In June 2021, Johnson visited the Netherlands as part of a delegation from Saba Island. Issues that the group wanted clarification on from the Dutch government included development, agricultural investment, transport links with Sint Maarten, educational investment, and affordable banking. In September 2021, she was part of a delegation that visited Bonaire where members of both island councils discussed issues such as access to medical care.
