= Ishmael Levenston =

Saban politician (1940–2019)

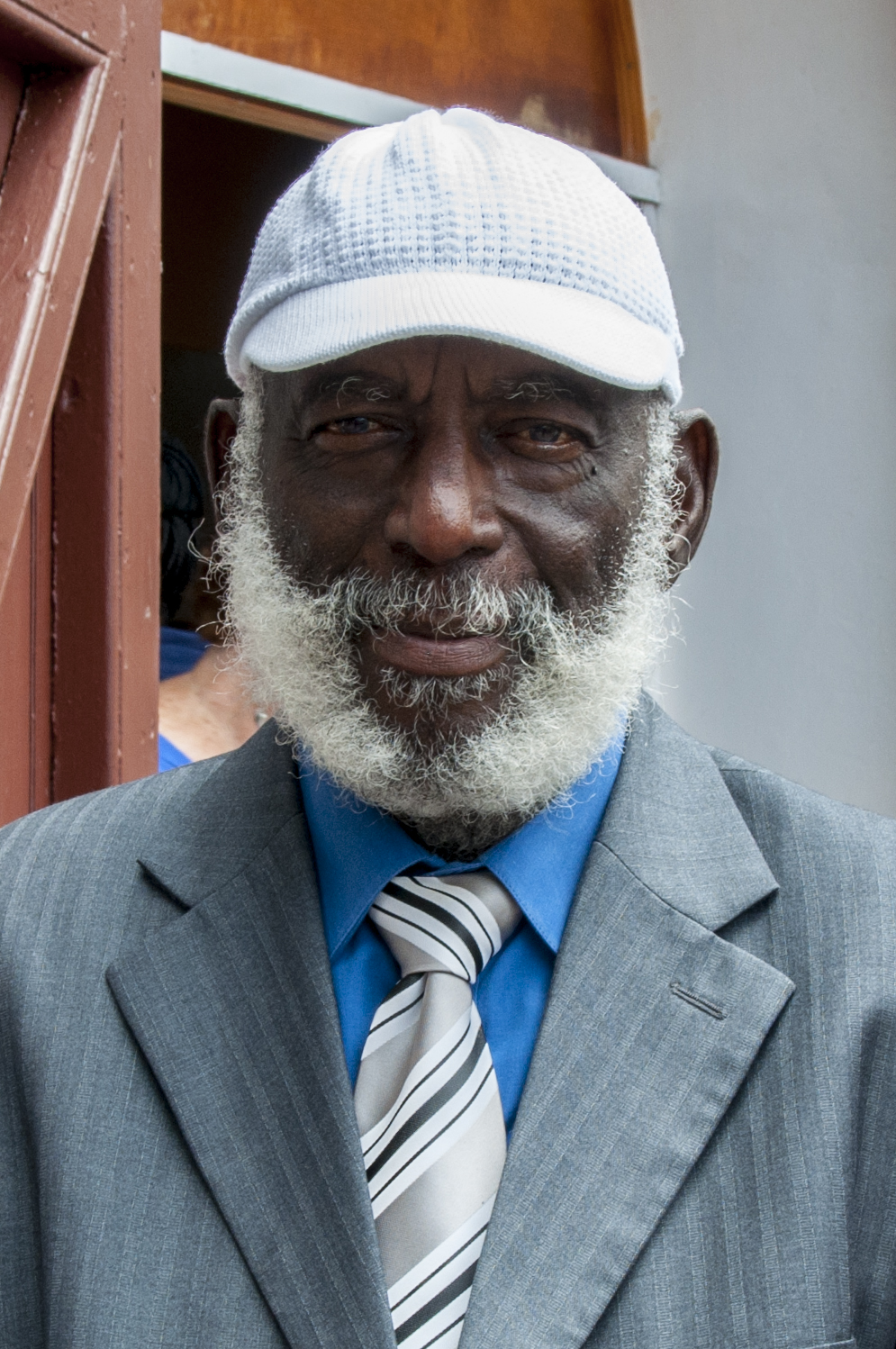

Personal details
- Born: 23 July 1940 Saba
- Died: 19 October 2019 (aged 79) The Bottom, Saba
- Party: Saba Labour Party
- Occupation: Politician

Ishmael Mathew Ameal Levenston (23 July 1940 – 19 October 2019) was a Saban politician and founder of the Saba Labour Party.

== Political career ==
Levenston entered Saba politics in 1975, following in the footsteps of his father, John Esmond Matthew Levenston. He was elected by preferential votes to the Island Council of Saba as a member of the Democratic Party. In 1979 he ran with the newly formed Saba People Party and lost his seat on the Island Council. For the 1983 Island Council election he teamed up with the Saba United Party (SUP) and got elected once again by preferential votes, serving as the opposition on the Island Council for four more years. In 1987 he formed the True Labour Democratic Party but did not obtain enough votes to be elected. In 1991 he helped the Windward Islands People's Movement regain control of the council but didn't get enough votes for a seat.

In 1999 Levenston returned to politics and established the Saba Labour Party (SLP). The SLP went on to secure at least one seat in every Island Council term except between 2003 and 2007. The 2019 elections, saw this feat come to end when the Windward Islands People's Movement won all 5 seats.

== Death ==
Ishmael M. A. Levenston died on 19 October 2019, aged 79 years, at the Henry Every Senior Citizen Home in The Bottom.
