= Union of French Muslim Democrats =

Political party in France

Union of French Muslim Democrats Union des démocrates musulmans français
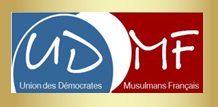
- Abbreviation: UDMF
- President: Farid Omeir
- Secretary: Oussama Adref
- Spokesperson: Eric Berlingen
- Founder: Nagib Azergui
- Founded: November 22, 2012; 13 years ago
- Newspaper: Le Foulard déchaîné
- Membership (2019): 900
- Ideology: Muslim interests Anti-Zionism
- European political alliance: Free Palestine Party
- National Assembly: 0 / 577
- Senate: 0 / 348
- European Parliament: 0 / 79

Website
- parti-udmf.fr

The Union of French Muslim Democrats (French: Union des démocrates musulmans français; UDMF) is a French political party founded in 2012. The party has faced criticism for purportedly being against the secular values of the French Republic, while it states that it is a non-religious party similar to existing Christian democratic parties.

== History ==
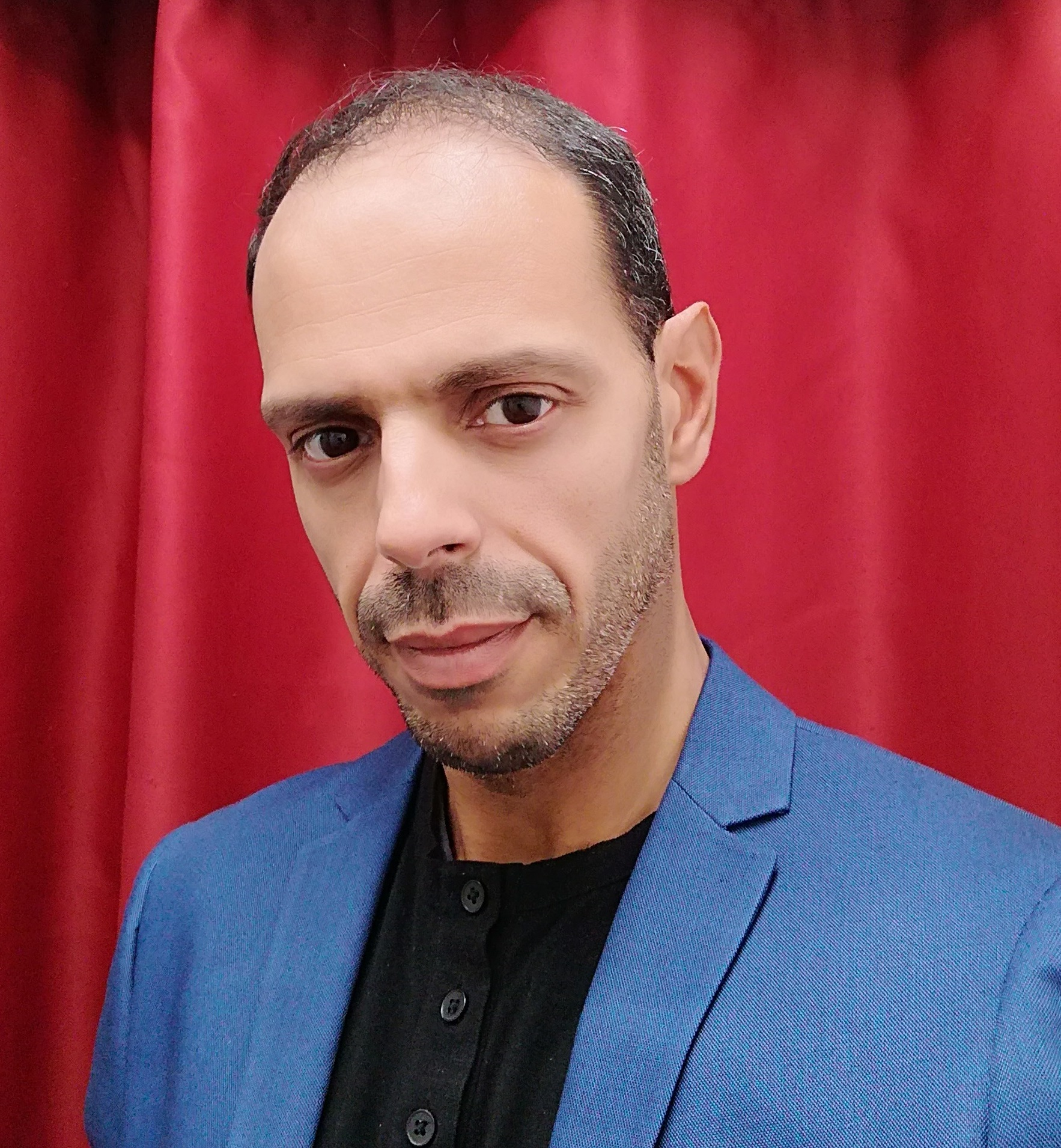
Nagib Azergui, founder of the UDMF

The party was founded in 2012 by Nagib Azergui, a trainer in new technologies from Nanterre in the Seine-et-Marne department in Île-de-France.

In the 2014 French municipal elections, the party ran lists in several towns, including Bobigny in Seine-Saint-Denis where the candidate for mayor was Kamal Moumni. The list was invalidated as Moumni was not a registered voter, and its members were absorbed into the Union of Democrats and Independents (UDI) list of incumbent mayor Stéphane de Paoli. Hocine Hebbali, a 31-year-old unemployed university graduate, became the first UDMF member to be voted to office; he was put in charge of local history and proposed a museum of French colonisation.

The UDMF was due to run candidates in the 2015 French departmental elections, but withdrew, citing a tense atmosphere.

In the 2017 French presidential election, Kamel Messaoudi, a radiologist from the Muslim-majority overseas department of Mayotte, sought to run for UDMF. His candidacy did not make it on to the ballot, as he received only three signatures from office-holders while the regulations required at least 500. In the legislative elections just after, the party ran 10 candidates, of which the most successful was Messaoudi taking 5.1% of the vote in Mayotte's 1st constituency.

Azergui wanted to run for UDMF in the 2022 French presidential election, but did not get enough signatures to qualify. In the legislative elections, the party ran 84 candidates, primarily in Île-de-France and 16 in Auvergne-Rhône-Alpes.

The UDMF established the Free Palestine Party, a European political alliance, ahead of the 2024 European Parliament election.

== Ideology ==
The UDMF defines itself as a non-religious movement inspired by the Christian Democratic Party of Christine Boutin. Its policies include the right for foreign residents to vote in local elections, the promotion of Islamic finance, and support for Turkish accession to the European Union. The party promotes the teaching of Arabic and the expansion of the Halal food industry, both for reasons of international commerce.

The party advocates that organizations such as Hamas, PFLP and Islamic Jihad should no longer be classified as terrorist organizations by the EU.

== Reception ==
Nathalie Kosciusko-Morizet, a former government minister, said in 2015 that the UDMF was sectarian and ran contrary to French republican values, while deputy Nicolas Dupont-Aignan said that such a party could lead to France fracturing like Lebanon. Malek Boutih, then a deputy of the Socialist Party, defended the rights of the UDMF to promote their views in a democracy, while also adding that the party would have a negligible impact on French politics.

Nizzar Bourchada, a councillor in Brie-Comte-Robert who was formerly of the UDI, joined the UDMF but left three months later, citing a lack of effective structuring in the party. He said that the party created headlines and then faded away. Bourchada said that in local elections, it was divisive to have a party with a religion in its name. M'hammed Henniche, secretary of the Union of Muslim Associations of Seine-Saint-Denis, said that the party would make the French believe that Muslims are sectarian, and therefore fuel Islamophobia.

== Election results ==
=== European elections ===
Election	Votes	%	Seats	+/−	EP Group	Note
2019	28,469	0.13 (#19)	0 / 79	–	−	
2024	15,401	0.06 (#20)	0 / 81	–	-	As part of Free Palestine Party
