= Antilliaans Dagblad =

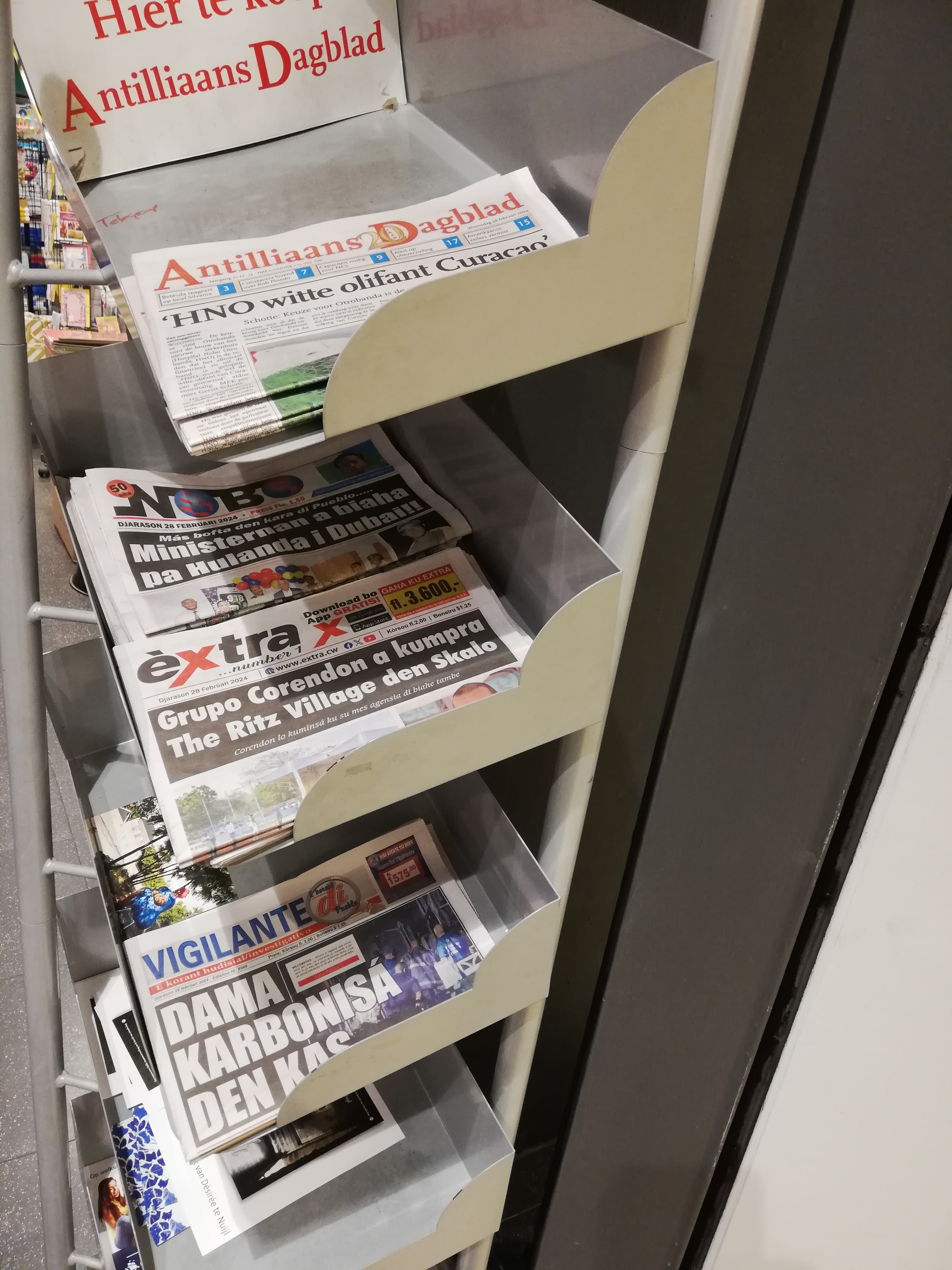
- Type: Daily morning newspaper
- Publisher: Michael Willemse
- Founded: 2003
- Language: Dutch
- OCLC number: 203983759
- Website: antilliaansdagblad.com

Antilliaans Dagblad (lit. 'The Antillean Daily') is a Dutch language daily morning newspaper distributed in the Dutch Caribbean islands of Aruba, Bonaire, Curaçao and Sint Maarten. The newspaper is the only Dutch-language newspaper on Curaçao together with Amigoe. The newspaper can be read partially online.

The newspaper was founded in 2003.
