= 2019 elections in Saba =

Elections were held in Saba on 20 March and 23 May 2019. These include:

- 2019 Dutch island council elections
- 2019 Dutch electoral college elections
- 2019 European Parliament election in the Netherlands
