= Saba Labour Party =

- Founder: Ishmael Levenston
- Ideology: Social democracy
- Political position: Centre-left
- Colours: Blue
- Saba Island council: 0 / 5

The Saba Labour Party (SLP) is a political party in Saba. The SLP was once the opposition party in the Island Council of Saba against the Windward Islands People's Movement, but lost both of its seats in the council in the 2019 election. The party held seats in the Parliament of the Netherlands Antilles until its dissolution in 2010. Ishmael Levenston, the leader of the party, died the same year it lost all of its seats.

== History ==
The Saba Labour Party and the Windward Islands People's Movement (WIPM) were the two major parties on Saba. The SLP was the opposition party in the Island Council of Saba in the 2000s and 2010s. The SLP held seats in the Parliament of the Netherlands Antilles until its dissolution in 2010.

In the 2007 election the SLP gained one seat on the island council. The SLP gained another seat on the island council in the 2015 election. However, it lost both of its seats on the island council in the 2019 election. Ishmael Levenston, the leader of the SLP, died in 2019 after the election results. The SLP failed to win any seats in the 2023 election.

== Political positions ==
The removal of physical therapy from the 2015 health insurance legislative package for Bonaire, St. Eustatius and Saba by Deputy Minister of Public Health, Wellbeing and Sports Edith Schippers was criticised by the Socialist Party and SLP.

The SLP is critical of Saba's current municipality status within the Netherlands, but does not want to change the status of the island and instead blames the WIPM for problems within the system.

== Works cited ==
=== Books ===
- Chauvin, Sébastien; Clegg, Peter; Cousin, Bruno, eds. (2018). Euro-Caribbean Societies in the 21st Century. Routledge. ISBN 9781351248877.

=== News ===
- "Ishmael Levenston passes away age 79". The Daily Herald. 21 October 2019. Archived from the original on 13 July 2025.
- "Nieuw: stemmen op zijn Nederlands". Trouw. 19 February 2011. Archived from the original on 13 July 2025.
- "Saba Mourns Passing of SLP-Leader Ishmael Levenston". BES-Reporter. 20 October 2019. Archived from the original on 13 July 2025.
- "SLP wins but WIPM still the largest". Saba News. 19 March 2015. Archived from the original on 13 July 2025.
- "SP criticises trimming of islands health care package". The Daily Herald. 15 September 2014. Archived from the original on 13 July 2025.
- "WIPM 3 seats in Saba elections, PEP 2 seats". Saba News. 16 March 2023. Archived from the original on 13 July 2025.
- van Dijk, Tim (18 March 2019). "Saba prepares itself for the island council elections with a new party". Caribbean Network. Archived from the original on 13 July 2025.
