= Bonaire People's Movement =

Bonaire People's Movement Movementu di Pueblo Boneriano
- Abbreviation: MPB
- Leader: Elvis Tjin Asjoe
- Founders: Elvis Tjin Asjoe; Hennyson Thielman
- Founded: 15 December 2013
- Senatorial affiliation: Democrats 66 (2019); Labour Party (2023)
- Colors: Light blue and red
- Island Council: 2 / 9
- Electoral College: 2 / 9

The Bonaire People's Movement (Papiamentu: Movementu di Pueblo Boneriano, MPB; Dutch: Boneriaanse Volksbeweging) is a Dutch local political party in the special municipality of Bonaire. The party was founded in 2013 and won the most votes in the 2015 island council election, taking three of nine seats and entering coalition with the Bonaire Patriotic Union (UPB). The coalition collapsed in 2016 but the MPB returned to government after the 2019 election, in which they won four seats, again in coalition with the UPB. The coalition lasted until the 2023 election where the MPB was reduced to two seats. They governed in coalition with the UPB for less than a year. They re-entered government in April 2026 in a new coalition with the UPB and an independent council member.

== History ==
=== Founding and 2015-2019 Islands Council session ===
The Bonaire People's Movement was founded on 15 December 2013 by Elvis Tjin Asjoe and Hennyson Thielman. Thielman founded the party soon after returning to the island after studying in Aruba and at the Vrije Universiteit Amsterdam. He had considered joining the Bonaire Patriotic Union (UPB) but decided against it after attending their conference.

The party received the most votes in the 2015 island council election, winning three seats. The MPB went on to form a government with the established and incumbent UPB. Together they held six of the nines seats on the Bonaire island council. The coalition collapsed in 2016 when two UPB members defected to join MPB. In 2017 a new coalition was formed, led by UPB who had attracted two members from the Bonaire Democratic Party (PDB).

=== 2019-2023 session ===
The MPB won the most seats of any party in 2019 island council election, placing four members on the council. The party again entered coalition with the UPB, which had won two seats. This coalition became the first since 2011 to last a full council term. In September 2020, island councillor Daisy Coffie left the party but retained her seat, reducing the number of seats to three.

=== Current session ===
In the 2023 island council election the MPB was reduced to two seats. The party entered coalition with the UPB, which had won three seats. This coalition collapsed when one of the MPB members left the party to sit as an independent. A new government was formed in October 2023 by the three-seat PDB in coalition with Movement 21 (M21) and an independent. This coalition collapsed when a PDB member left the party to sit as an independent in January 2026. It was reported that the MPB was in discussions with UPB and M21 to form a new coalition. Discussions did not concluded until April when agreement was reached with the UPB and an independent member to form a new coalition to govern.
