= Lead candidate =

Dutch term for a lead candidate in an election

In politics, a lead candidate (German: Spitzenkandidat; Dutch: lijsttrekker, lit. 'list puller') is the candidate placed first on a party list. In parliamentary systems, it is often the party's nominee for the position of head of government, and the party chair or party leader.

== Usage by country ==
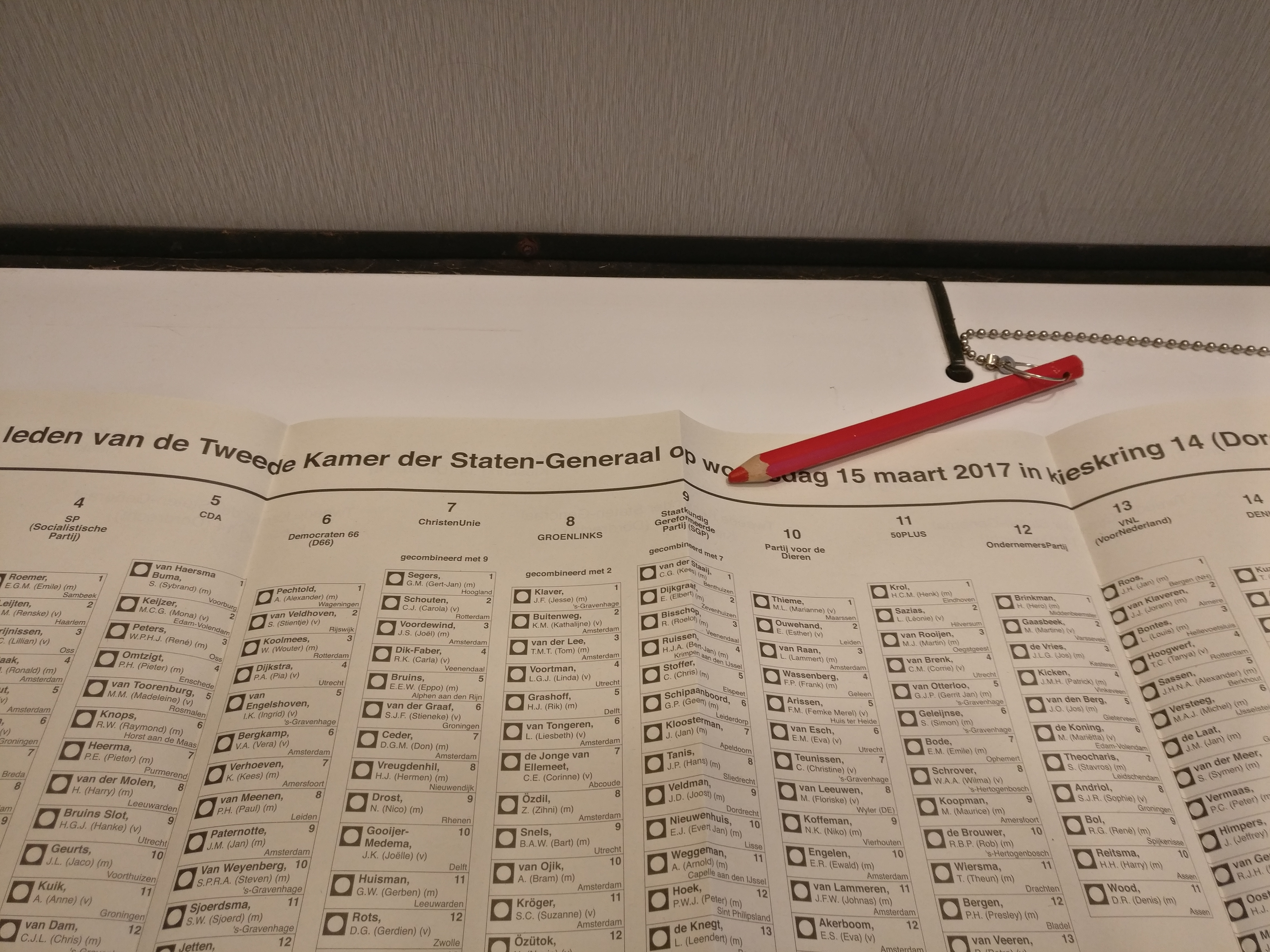
Voting ballot for the 2017 Dutch general election, with each party's lead candidate listed at the top

=== Netherlands ===
In the Netherlands, which uses a system of open-list proportional representation, the lead candidates in elections for the House of Representatives are almost always the parties' political leaders. When elected, the lead candidate usually becomes the party's parliamentary leader in the House of Representatives. When a coalition is formed, the lead candidates of the member parties almost always become senior ministers in the Cabinet, requiring them to vacate their seats in parliament. Traditionally, the lead candidate of the largest party in the governing coalition becomes Prime Minister. An exception came following the 2023 Dutch general election. PVV leader Geert Wilders did not become part of the government, let alone lead it, the despite being the lead candidate of the largest party in the Schoof cabinet.

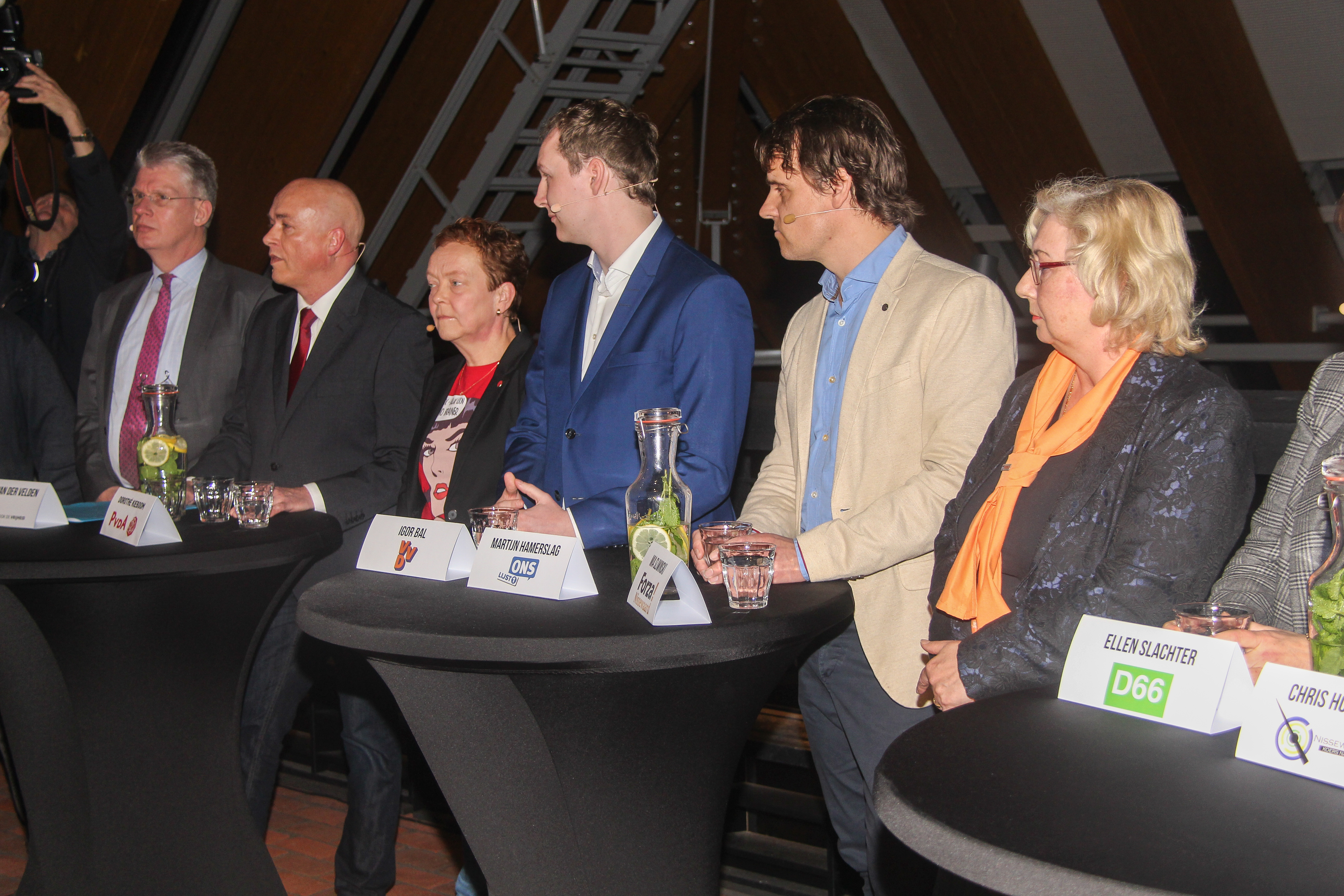
Lead candidates of the 2018 Dutch municipal election in Nissewaard

The term is also used in provincial, municipal, water board and island council elections, as well as in elections to the European Parliament and the Senate. In these elections, the lead candidates of national parties tend to be different from the party leaders. They are also not the parties' nominees for the positions of King's commissioner, mayor, dike-reeve or lieutenant governor.

=== Belgium ===
In Belgium, elections to the Chamber of Representatives only feature provincial electoral lists since the 2012–2014 state reform. As a consequence, there are usually six lead candidates per party. In general, one of them is the party leader. Prior to the state reform, some of the party leaders ran as lijsttrekker on the Senate list.

== See also ==
- Lijstduwer – the last candidate on the electoral list
