= Elvis Tjin Asjoe =

Netherlands Antilles politician (born 1966)

Personal details
- Born: Elvis Erwin Jules Tjin Asjoe; 9 January 1966 (age 60) Antriol, Netherlands Antilles

Elvis Erwin Jules Tjin Asjoe (born 9 January 1966 in Antriol) is a Dutch politician. Since 6 December 2022, he has been an island deputy for health care and culture in the Executive Board of Bonaire. After 10 October 2010, he had held this position several times. Before that, he was minister of the Netherlands Antilles in the first and second de Jongh-Elhage cabinets.

== Life ==
Tjin Asjoe was born in Antriol as the youngest of four children of Elvia Nicolaas and Eugene Tjin Asjoe. His father was from Suriname and went to work in Bonaire for Schunck Kleding Industrie. After high school, Tjin Asjoe went to the MTS in Curaçao and continued his studies at the HTS in Enschede where he graduated laude. After returning to Bonaire, he worked at Bonaire Trading as head of automation. A year later, he set up his own ICT company with a partner.

== Politics ==
After the agreement with the Netherlands that Bonaire would become a special municipality, Tjin Asjoe made the switch from business to politics. He ran on the Bonaire Patriotic Union (UPB) list in the 2007 island council elections. On 13 June 2007 he became Minister of Economic Affairs of the Netherlands Antilles after Burney Elhage exchanged this ministerial post for the appointment as deputy in the Bonaire Executive Council. Tjin Asjoe resigned on 19 March 2009, but returned to the de Jongh-Elhage II cabinet in the same ministerial post from 26 March 2010 until the dissolution of the Netherlands Antilles on 10 October 2010.

In the island council elections of 2011, the first election as a special Dutch municipality, Tjin Asjoe was the biggest vote-getter of the UPB. However, as an advisor to Prime Minister Mike Eman, he chose to manage a number of projects in Aruba, including the Aruba-Bonaire fraternity protocol. In 2013 he returned to Bonairean politics with the Bonaire People's Movement (MPB), which he founded.

In the island council elections in 2015, the MBP became the largest party in Bonaire. After the formation of the executive board failed, Tjin Asjoe became MPB councillor, group leader and opposition leader in the island council. The fall of the coalition in 2016 allowed the MPB to co-govern. Tjin Asjoe became an island deputy twice for a short period of time, including with the portfolios of economy and government companies. After the 2019 island council election, he took office on 8 April 2019 as island deputy for finance, economic affairs and tourism in the MPB-UPB governing coalition. On 26 November 2020, he temporarily resigned as an island deputy for personal reasons. In consultation with his party MPB, it was agreed that he would return to office a year prior to the elections in March 2022. For some time there had been criticism of his policy and the failure to meet the agreed date of 15 November for the presentation of the island budget 2021 to the Cft BES. In the meantime, his portfolios are taken over by Hennyson Thielman. On 22 December 2020, Tjin Asjoe was sworn in as a member of the island council. In this council he is also MPB group leader. On 6 December 2022, he succeeded Nina den Heyer as a member of the Executive Board of Bonaire.
