= Bonaire Democratic Party =

Bonaire Democratic Party Partido Demokrátiko Boneriano
- Abbreviation: PDB; Demokrat
- Leader: Clark Abraham
- President: Peter Silberie
- Secretary: Cardine Cicilia
- Leader in the Island Council: Clark Abraham
- Founder: Julio Antonio Abraham
- Founded: 1954
- Ideology: Social democracy Progressivism; Autonomism
- Political position: Centre-left
- Regional affiliation: COPPPAL
- Colors: Red
- Island Council: 3 / 9

Website
- https://www.votademokrat.org

The Bonaire Democratic Party (Papiamentu: Partido Demokrátiko Boneriano, PDB; Dutch: Democratische Partij Bonaire) is a political party in Bonaire and formerly the Netherlands Antilles.

== History ==
The party was founded in 1954 by Julio Antonio Abraham. It is a progressive social-democratic party that advocates for more autonomy for the island of Bonaire.

In the 2002 Netherlands Antilles general election, the party won 2.6% of the popular vote and one out of 22 seats in the Estates. In the 2006 general election, the party kept one seat, winning 44.5% of the vote in Bonaire. In the 2015 island council election, the party won three out of nine seats and formed a coalition with the Bonaire Patriotic Union (UPB).

In the 2019 election, the party won three seats in the Island Council.
