= Progressive Labour Party (Sint Eustatius) =

- Abbreviation: PLP
- Leader: Rechelline Leerdam
- Leader in the Island Council: Rechelline Leerdam
- Founded: 5 September 2001; 23 years ago
- Ideology: Social democracy
- Political position: Centre-left
- Colours: Orange
- Island Council: 3 / 5

The Progressive Labour Party (PLP, Dutch: Progressieve Arbeiderspartij) is a political party in Sint Eustatius. The PLP was founded in 2001 by Clyde van Putten. The party's motto is "United together we shall stand as one".
