= Electoral colleges for the Senate =

Electoral colleges in the Caribbean Netherlands

The electoral colleges for the Senate (Dutch: kiescolleges voor de Eerste Kamer; Papiamentu: kolegionan elektoral pa Eerste Kamer) are the electoral colleges of the Caribbean Netherlands and Dutch expatriates. Their members together with the members of the provincial councils in the European Netherlands choose the Senators of the Dutch Senate.

The first electoral college elections (then only in the Caribbean Netherlands) were held on 20 March 2019, simultaneously with the island council elections, and the European Netherlands' provincial elections and water board elections. On 27 May 2019, the colleges cast their votes for the Senate election.

The most recent electoral college elections were held on 15 March 2023.

== Seats ==
The number of members of the electoral colleges for the Senate is equal to the number of members of the island council. The number of members varies per island. Nonetheless, it is always an odd number of members.

- Bonaire: 9 seats
- St. Eustatius: 5 seats
- Saba: 5 seats
- Expatriates: 25 seats
