= Democratic Party (Sint Eustatius) =

- Abbreviation: DP
- Leader: Raquel Spanner-Carty
- President: Winston Fleming
- Leader in the Island Council: Raquel Spanner-Carty
- Founded: 31 December 1948; 77 years ago
- Ideology: Christian democracy
- Political position: Centre
- Senatorial affiliation: Christian Democratic Appeal (2019); Democrats 66 (2023)
- Colours: Red
- Island Council: 1 / 5
- Electoral College: 5 / 5

Website
- www.dp-eux.com

The Democratic Party (DP, Dutch: Democratische Partij) is a political party in Sint Eustatius. It is the oldest political party still existing in Sint Eustatius. Founded in 1948, it was originally active on Sint Maarten, Saba and Sint Eustatius before becoming an independent party.

== Netherlands Antilles ==
In 2002 the party obtained the single Sint Eustatius seat in the Estates of the Netherlands Antilles (which it won in the 2002, 2006 (uncontested) and 2010 elections). In 2007, the party won 4 of the seats on the 5-seat Island Council.

== Post-Antilles era ==
After the disbanding of the Netherlands Antilles in 2010, the Democratic party has had representation on the Island Council. In elections in 2011, 2015, 2020 and 2023, there have been two DP members elected. Currently, two DP members sit on the Island Council: Mercedes Lopes-Spanner and Raquel Spanner-Carty.
