= Bonaire Patriotic Union =

Bonaire Patriotic Union Union Patriótiko Boneriano
- Abbreviation: UPB
- Leader: James Kroon
- Leader in the Island Council: Esther Bernabela
- Founded: 23 October 1969
- Ideology: Christian democracy
- Political position: Centre
- International affiliation: Centrist Democrat International
- American affiliation: Christian Democrat Organization of America
- Colors: Green
- Island Council: 2 / 9
- Electoral College: 2 / 9

The Bonaire Patriotic Union (Papiamentu: Union Patriótiko Boneriano, UPB; Dutch: Patriottische Unie van Bonaire) is a Dutch local political party in the special municipality of Bonaire.

== History ==
In the 2002 Netherlands Antilles general election, the party won 3.6% of the popular vote and two out of 22 seats. In the 2006 Netherlands Antilles general election, the party again won two out of 22 seats. It is a member of the Centrist Democrat International and the Christian Democrat Organization of America.
