= Island council (Netherlands) =

Elected body on the isles of the Caribbean Netherlands

The island council (Dutch: eilandsraad; Papiamentu: konseho insular) is a form of local government in special municipalities in the Caribbean Netherlands. It is similar to municipal council in the European part of the Netherlands.

== List ==
Currently three island councils exist in:

1. Bonaire
2. Sint Eustatius
3. (Saba (island)) Saba

The island councils were already in existence as island councils of the Netherlands Antilles until their dissolution and became island councils of the Netherlands after that. Elections of the island council coincide with the elections for the States-Provincial and water boards in the European Netherlands, as well as for each island's electoral college for the Senate which consists of representatives with the right to elect the Senate together with the representatives of the States-Provincial.

== See also ==
- Electoral colleges for the Senate
- Island council (Netherlands Antilles)
- Municipalities of the Netherlands
