= Ludmila de Weever =

Sint Maarten politician

Minister of Tourism, Economic Affairs, Transport and Telecommunication
- Incumbent
- Assumed office 28 March 2020
- Prime Minister: Silveria Jacobs

Ludmila de Weever is a Sint Maarten politician. As of 28 March 2020, she serves as Minister of Tourism, Economic Affairs, Transport and Telecommunication in the second cabinet of Prime Minister Silveria Jacobs.
