= Richard Panneflek =

Sint Maarten politician

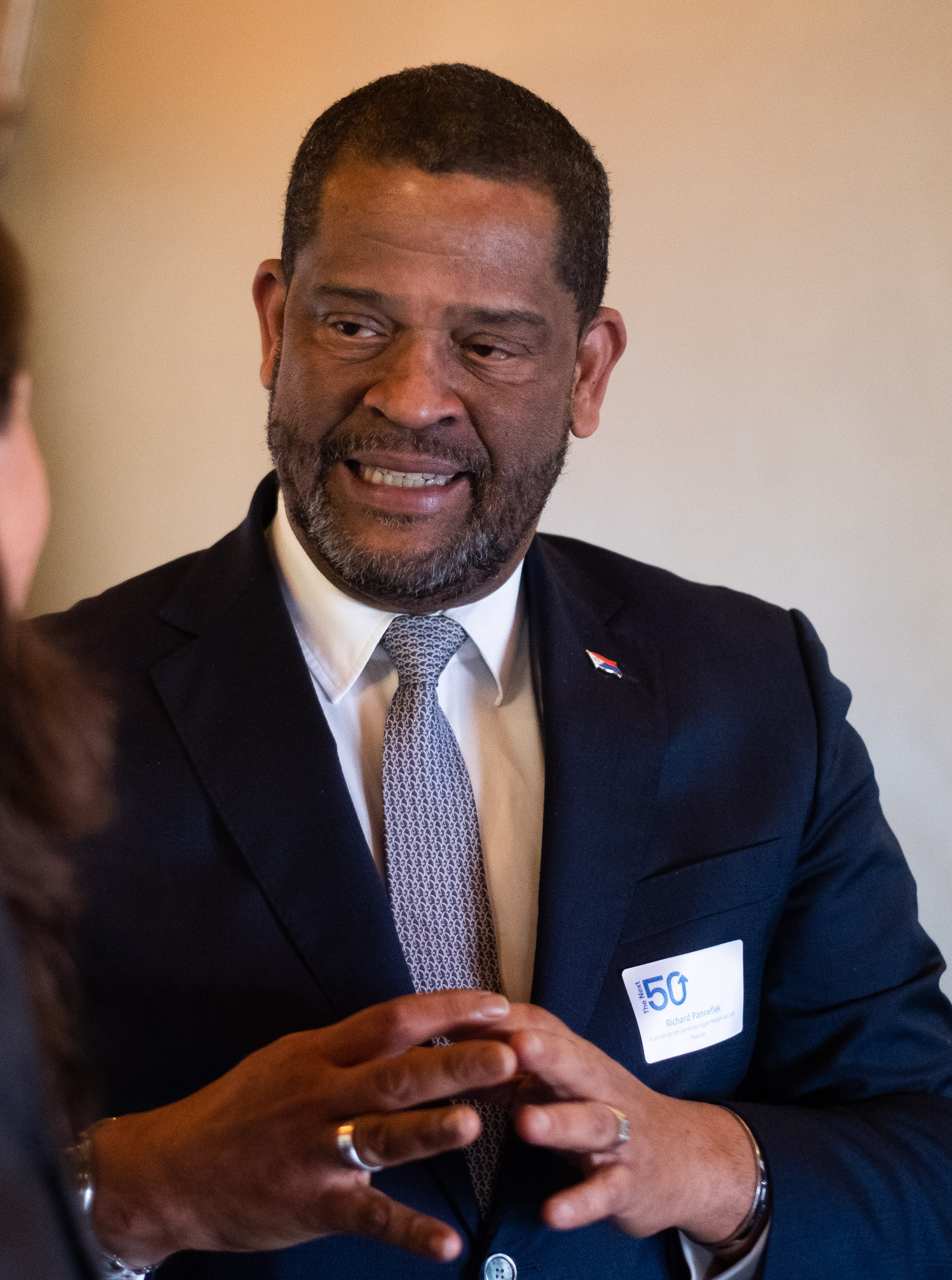

Minister of Public Health, Social Development and Labour
- Incumbent
- Assumed office 28 March 2020
- Prime Minister: Silveria Jacobs

Richard Panneflek is a Sint Maarten politician. As of 28 March 2020, he serves as Minister of Public Health, Social Development and Labour in the second cabinet of Prime Minister Silveria Jacobs.
