= First Wever-Croes cabinet =

10th cabinet of Aruba

- 10th cabinet of Aruba
- Date formed: 17 November 2017
- Date dissolved: 20 September 2021 (4 years, 76 days in office)

People and organisations
- Monarch: King Willem-Alexander
- Governor: Alfonso Boekhoudt
- Prime Minister: Evelyn Wever-Croes
- Deputy Prime Minister: Otmar Oduber (2017–2019); Andin Bikker (2020–2021)
- No. of ministers: 8
- Member party: People's Electoral Movement (MEP); Proud and Respected People (POR); Democratic Network (RED)
- Status in legislature: Coalition government

History
- Election: 2017 election
- Outgoing election: 2021 election
- Predecessor: Second Mike Eman cabinet
- Successor: Second Wever-Croes cabinet

The first Wever-Croes cabinet (Papiamento: Gabinete Wever-Croes I) was the cabinet of Aruba from 17 November 2017 to 20 September 2021. It was formed by a coalition government of the political parties People's Electoral Movement (MEP), Proud and Respected People (POR) and Democratic Network (RED), and was led by Prime Minister Evelyn Wever-Croes. It was the country's first coalition government in sixteen years and the first cabinet to be headed by a woman.

The cabinet served during the late 2010s and the start of the 2020s. Notable issues during the first Wever-Croes cabinet included the COVID-19 pandemic in Aruba, and the corruption case Flamingo. The cabinet fell on 30 March 2021, after an investigation had been launched into the possible embezzlement of public money by coalition party POR. It continued to serve as a demissionary cabinet until 20 September 2021.

== Formation ==
Shortly after the 2017 general election, the parties MEP (9 seats), POR (2 seats) and RED (1 seat) agreed to form a coalition government, thereby excluding the Aruban People's Party (AVP), which had received the most votes. Although the coalition parties initially wanted to form a government consisting of seven ministers, they ultimately compromised at having eight, with five ministries going to MEP, two to POR and one to RED. The position of Minister Plenipotentiary also went to MEP.

The cabinet's coalition agreement was titled "Together for Aruba" (Papiamento: Hunto pa Aruba). The parties agreed that the most important issues that needed to be addressed were the financial situation, political integrity, and the wellbeing of Aruban citizens. The cabinet was sworn in by Governor Alfonso Boekhoudt on 17 November 2017.

== Notable events ==
=== Resignation of Otmar Oduber ===
On 12 December 2019, Deputy Prime Minister and Minister of Infrastructure and Environment Otmar Oduber resigned from his position, stating health, family and personal reasons. In June 2020, judicial authorities conducted a search of Oduber's house in relation to the corruption case Flamingo.

=== Dismissal of Marisol Lopez-Tromp ===
In July 2020, tensions ran high within the cabinet when Minister of Justice and Immigration Andin Bikker and the POR party withdrew their confidence in Oduber's replacement as Minister of Infrastructure and Environment, Marisol Lopez-Tromp. A Parliament meeting that had been organized to discuss a motion of no confidence in Lopez-Tromp was postponed at the last minute to allow for a mediation attempt in the Prime Minister's office. POR threatened to let the government lose its majority if Lopez-Tromp would not be dismissed.

On 22 October 2020 Lopez-Tromp was dismissed from the cabinet, as the majority of the cabinet, as well as a majority in Parliament, stated they did not support her anymore. Prime Minister Wever-Croes took over her portfolio. Wever-Croes stated that having Lopez-Tromp in the cabinet led to an "unworkable situation" and a loss of citizens' confidence in the government. Lopez-Tromp stated that her anti-corruption policy and the continued influence of former minister Oduber within the government were the main reasons she clashed with her party, the cabinet and Parliament.

== Composition ==
Prime minister and Deputy prime ministers in the first Wever-Croes cabinet
Title	Minister		Term of office		Party
Title	Minister		Start	End	Party
Prime Minister	Evelyn Wever-Croes	Evelyn Wever-Croes	17 November 2017	Incumbent (Note: Retained this position after dissolution of the cabinet.)	MEP
Deputy Prime Minister	Otmar Oduber	Otmar Oduber	17 November 2017	12 December 2019 (Note: Resigned from this position.)	POR
Deputy Prime Minister	Andin Bikker	Andin Bikker	2 January 2020	20 September 2021	POR

Ministers in the first Wever-Croes cabinet
Title	Minister		Term of office		Party
Title	Minister		Start	End	Party
Minister of General Affairs, Integrity, Energy and Innovation	Evelyn Wever-Croes	Evelyn Wever-Croes	17 November 2017	20 September 2021	MEP
Minister of Finance, Economic Affairs and Culture	Xiomara Maduro	Xiomara Maduro	17 November 2017	20 September 2021	MEP
Minister of Infrastructure and Environment	Otmar Oduber	Otmar Oduber	17 November 2017	12 December 2019	POR
Minister of Infrastructure and Environment	Evelyn Wever-Croes	Evelyn Wever-Croes (ad interim)	12 December 2019	28 January 2020	MEP
Minister of Infrastructure and Environment	Marisol Lopez-Tromp	Marisol Lopez-Tromp	28 January 2020	22 October 2020 (Note: Marisol Lopez-Tromp was dismissed as Minister of Infrastructure and Environment on 22 October 2020.)	POR
Minister of Infrastructure and Environment	Evelyn Wever-Croes	Evelyn Wever-Croes	22 October 2020	20 September 2021	MEP
Minister of Education, Science and Sustainable Development	Rudy Lampe	Rudy Lampe	12 December 2019	20 September 2021	RED
Minister of Tourism, Public Health and Sports	Dangui Oduber	Dangui Oduber	17 November 2017	20 September 2021	MEP
Minister of Transport, Communications and the Primary Sector	Chris Romero	Chris Romero	17 November 2017	20 September 2021	MEP
Minister of Social Affairs and Labor	Glenbert Croes	Glenbert Croes	17 November 2017	20 September 2021	MEP
Minister of Justice and Immigration	Andin Bikker	Andin Bikker	17 November 2017	20 September 2021	POR

Plenipotentiaries of the first Wever-Croes cabinet (Note: Not formally members of the cabinet.)
Title	Minister		Term of office		Party
Title	Minister		Start	End	Party
Minister Plenipotentiary	Guillfred Besaril	Guillfred Besaril	20 November 2017	1 July 2022	MEP
Deputy Minister Plenipotentiary and Permanent Representative to the European Union	Eddy Paris	Eddy Paris	1 January 2018	1 January 2022 (Note: Ad interim from 20 September 2021.)	MEP
