= Second Wever-Croes cabinet =

11th cabinet of Aruba

- 11th cabinet of Aruba
- Date formed: 20 September 2021 (4 years, 116 days in office)

People and organisations
- Monarch: King Willem-Alexander
- Governor: Alfonso Boekhoudt
- Prime Minister: Evelyn Wever-Croes
- Deputy Prime Ministers: Ursell Arends; Xiomara Maduro
- No. of ministers: 8
- Member party: People's Electoral Movement (MEP); RAIZ
- Status in legislature: Coalition government

History
- Election: 2021 election
- Outgoing election: 2024 election
- Predecessor: First Wever-Croes cabinet

The second Wever-Croes cabinet (Papiamento: Gabinete Wever-Croes II) is the current cabinet of Aruba. It was installed on 20 September 2021 by Deputy Governor Yvonne Laclé-Dirksz. The cabinet is formed by a coalition government of the center-left political parties People's Electoral Movement (MEP) and RAIZ, and is led by Prime Minister Evelyn Wever-Croes.

== Formation ==
The 2021 general election resulted in a Parliament in which none of the elected parties holds an absolute majority. As the largest party in Parliament, MEP (9 seats) was therefore given the initiative to form a coalition government. The party stated that it was willing to form a coalition with any other party, except the Aruban People's Party (AVP).

On 8 July 2021, MEP and RAIZ (2 seats) signed a declaration of intent to form a coalition government. Throughout the formation, the aspiring coalition parties organized more than 100 meetings with various stakeholders and interest groups. On 19 August, a coalition agreement was signed by the two parties. The cabinet was installed on 20 September.

== Composition ==
The second Wever-Croes cabinet consists of eight ministers. Six ministries went to MEP, and two to RAIZ. The position of Minister Plenipotentiary also went to MEP. Four ministers from the previous cabinet were given a position in the second Wever-Croes cabinet: Evelyn Wever-Croes, Xiomara Maduro, Dangui Oduber and Glenbert Croes. Due to rearrangements, the division of portfolios among the ministers was slightly altered.

Prime Minister and Deputy Prime Ministers in the second Wever-Croes cabinet
Title	Minister		Term of office		Party
Title	Minister		Start	End	Party
Prime Minister	Evelyn Wever-Croes	Evelyn Wever-Croes	17 November 2017 (Note: Retained this position from the previous cabinet.)	Incumbent	MEP
First Deputy Prime Minister	Ursell Arends	Ursell Arends	20 September 2021	Incumbent	RAIZ
Second Deputy Prime Minister	Xiomara Maduro	Xiomara Maduro	20 September 2021	Incumbent	MEP

Ministers in the second Wever-Croes cabinet
Title	Minister		Term of office		Party
Title	Minister		Start	End	Party
Minister of General Affairs, Innovation, Government Organization, Infrastructure and Spatial Planning	Evelyn Wever-Croes	Evelyn Wever-Croes	20 September 2021	Incumbent	MEP
Minister of Finance and Culture	Xiomara Maduro	Xiomara Maduro	20 September 2021	Incumbent	MEP
Minister of Transport, Integrity, Nature and Elderly Affairs	Ursell Arends	Ursell Arends	20 September 2021	Incumbent	RAIZ
Minister of Justice and Social Affairs	Rocco Tjon	Rocco Tjon	20 September 2021	Incumbent	MEP
Minister of Economic Affairs, Communications and Sustainable Development	Geoffrey Wever	Geoffrey Wever	20 September 2021	Incumbent	RAIZ
Minister of Public Health and Tourism	Dangui Oduber	Dangui Oduber	20 September 2021	Incumbent	MEP
Minister of Labor, Integration and Energy	Glenbert Croes	Glenbert Croes	20 September 2021	Incumbent	MEP
Minister of Education and Sports	Endy Croes	Endy Croes	20 September 2021	Incumbent	MEP

Plenipotentiaries of the second Wever-Croes cabinet (Note: Not formally members of the cabinet.)
Title	Minister		Term of office		Party
Title	Minister		Start	End	Party
Minister Plenipotentiary	Guillfred Besaril	Guillfred Besaril	20 November 2017	1 July 2022 (Note: Resigned from this position.)	MEP
Deputy Minister Plenipotentiary and Permanent Representative to the European Union	Ady Thijsen	Ady Thijsen	1 January 2022	Incumbent	MEP
