= Dangui Oduber =

Aruban politician

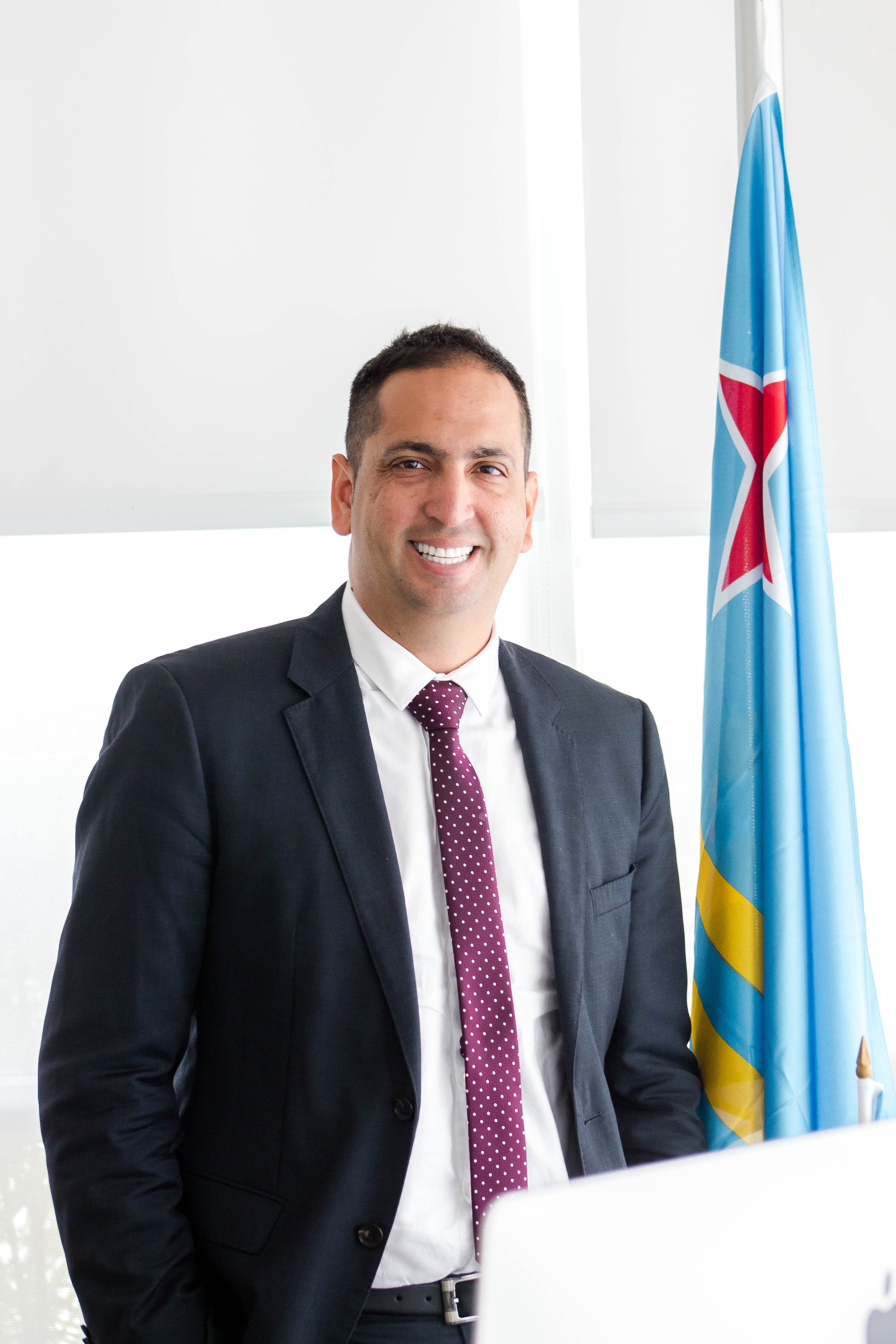

Minister of Tourism & Public Health
- Incumbent
- Assumed office September 20, 2021
- Monarch: Willem-Alexander
- Prime Minister: Evelyn Wever-Croes
- Preceded by: Alex Schwengle

Minister of Sport
- In office November 17, 2017 – September 20, 2021
- Monarch: Willem-Alexander
- Prime Minister: Evelyn Wever-Croes
- Preceded by: Alex Schwengle

Member of Parliament
- In office November 2013 – November 17, 2017

Personal details
- Born: Danguillaume Pierino Oduber; July 13, 1978 (age 47) Oranjestad, Aruba
- Party: People's Electoral Movement
- Children: 2
- Parent: Nelson Oduber

Danguillaume Pierino Oduber (born July 13, 1978) is an Aruban politician serving as Minister of Tourism and Public Health in the second Wever-Croes Cabinet. He previously served as a member of Parliament

== Early life ==
Oduber was born on July 13, 1978, in Oranjestad, Aruba, to Nelson Oduber - the former Prime Minister of Aruba - and Glenda Croes. He has two siblings, Glenson and Nelson Jr.

He attended Bon Bini Primary school and after, attended La Salle Secondary School. After finishing secondary school, Oduber attended Colegio Arubano and graduated with his HAVO diploma. following his graduation, Oduber moved to the Netherlands where he graduated from the Inholland University of Applied Sciences with a Bachelor's Degree in Economics.

After returning home, Oduber started working for the telecommunications service provider, SETAR.

== Politics ==
Oduber joined the People's Electoral Movement (MEP) and formally started his political career in 2013. In his first election, The 2013 Aruban general election, he scored 1749 votes. The election was won by the Aruban People's Party (AVP) but Oduber secured a seat in the Estates of Aruba.

In the 2017 Aruban General Election, the People's Electoral Movement (MEP) won 2 seats with 37.61% of the vote, resulting in a tie between the two major parties. On November 17, 2017, The coalition cabinet between the People's Electoral Movement (MEP), Network of Electoral Democracy and Pueblo Orguyoso y Respeta (POR) was formed and was sworn in. Oduber was then named The Minister of Tourism, Public Health and Sport.

Oduber has initiated various projects that benefit his respective fields which included signing a proposition that allows students from countries that are not allowed to practice medicine in Aruba (Including locals studying medicine in countries not recognized by the law) to practice their craft. ARUBIG was officially put in place in October 2021.

Following the 2021 Aruban general election, Oduber's party secured 9 seats with 35.32% of the vote. On August 19 following the appointment of the formateur, MEP reached an agreement with RAIZ to form a government, becoming Aruba's third minority coalition government. Oduber was sworn in as Minister of Tourism & Public Health on September 20, 2021.
