= List of political parties in Aruba =

Aruba has a multi-party political system with numerous historical and contemporary political parties. Several parties have emerged from labor movements, independence activism, and constitutional debates following Aruba’s Status Aparte in 1986.

== Parties ==
The native party names are mostly in Papiamento or Dutch with several derived from Venezuelan party names in Spanish.

=== Parties represented in Parliament ===
Party	Abbr.	Leader	Political position	Ideology	MPs
Aruban People's Party; Dutch: Arubaanse Volkspartij; Papiamento: Partido di Pueblo Arubano	AVP	Mike Eman	Centre-right	Aruban regionalism; Conservatism; Christian democracy	9 / 21
People's Electoral Movement; Papiamento: Movimiento Electoral di Pueblo; Dutch: Electorale Volksbeweging	MEP	Evelyn Wever-Croes	Centre-left	Social democracy; Separatism	8 / 21
FUTURO; English: FUTURE; Dutch: TOEKOMST	TUR	Gerlien Croes; Geoffrey Wever			3 / 21
Aruban Patriotic Party; Papiamento: Partido Patriotico di Aruba; Dutch: Arubaanse Patriottische Partij	PPA	Otmar Oduber	Centre-left	Social democracy	1 / 21

=== Minor parties (extra-parliamentary) ===
Party	Abbr.	Leader	Political position	Ideology	Votes
Accion 21; English: Action 21; Dutch: Actie 21	A21	Miguel Mansur	Centre	Liberal; Progressive	2,203
United Christians Reinforcing the Potential of Aruba; Papiamento: Cristiannan Uni Reforzando Potencial di Aruba; Dutch: Verenigde Christenen ter Versterking van het Potentieel van Aruba	CURPA	Eric Ras			423
Youth Bringing Change; Papiamento: Hubentud Treciendo Cambio; Dutch: Jeugd die Verandering Brengt	HTC	Gilbert Webb			505
Fight for Reform; Papiamento: Lucha pa Reforma; Dutch: Strijd voor Hervorming	LpR	Rycond Santos do Nascimento			1,349
Aruban Sovereignty Movement; Papiamento: Movimiento Arubano Soberano; Dutch: Arubaanse Soevereiniteitsbeweging	MAS	Marisol Lopez-Tromp	Centre-left	Social democracy	1,727
RAIZ; English: ROOTS; Dutch: WORTELS	RAIZ	Ursell Arends	Centre-left	Social democracy	2,324
Democratic Network; Papiamento: Red Democratico; Dutch: Democratisch Netwerk	RED	Ricardo Croes		Progressivism; Green politics	635

=== Inactive/defunct parties ===
This list includes parties that are currently registered with the Aruban Electoral Council and/or have participated in a general election either on their own or in a combined list.

- Accion Democratico 86 (Democratic Action 86, AD86)
- Acción Democratico Nacional (National Democratic Action, ADN)
- Aliansa Democratico Arubano (Aruban Democratic Alliance, Aliansa)
- Aruba su Bienestar Organisacion (Organization for Aruba’s Well-Being, ABO)
- Conscientisacion pa Liberacion di Aruba (Consciousness-raising for the Liberation of Aruba, CLA)
- Convergencia Royalista Nacional (Nationalist Royalist Convergence, CORONA)
- Movemento Indigena Arubano (Aruban Indigenous Movement, MIA)
- Movimiento Patriotico Arubano (Aruban Patriotic Movement, MPA)
- Movimiento Social Independiente (Independent Social Movement, MSI)
- Movimiento Socialista di Aruba (Socialist Movement of Aruba, MSA)
- Organisacion Liberal Arubano (Aruban Liberal Organization, OLA)
- Partido Democratico Arubano (Aruban Democratic Party, PDA)
- Partido Direccion Politiea (Citizenship Direction Party, PDP)
- Partido pa un Aruba Restructura Awor (Party for a Restructured Aruba Now, PARA)
- Partido Democracia Real (Real Democracay Party, PDR)
- Partido Patriotico Nobo (New Patriotic Party, PPN)
- Plataforma Politico di Trahador (Political Platform of Workers, PPT)
- Pueblo Orguyoso y Respeta (Proud and Respected People, POR)
- Pueblo Prome (People First, PP)
- Summum Bonum (The Highest Good, Summum Bonum)
- Union Patriotico Progresista (Progressive Patriotic Union, UPP)

== See also ==
- Politics of Aruba
- List of political parties by country
