= Paul Croes =

Aruban politician

Minister of Social Affairs, Youth and Labor
- In office 30 October 2013 – 17 November 2017
- Prime Minister: Mike Eman
- Succeeded by: Glenbert Croes

Speaker of Parliament
- In office 21 June 2010 – 30 October 2013
- Preceded by: Andy Lee
- Succeeded by: Marisol Lopez-Tromp

Member of Parliament
- In office 29 October 2009 – 30 October 2013

Personal details
- Born: 7 November 1976 (age 50) Aruba, Netherlands Antilles
- Party: Aruban People's Party

Pauldrick François Teodoric "Paul" Croes (born 7 November 1976) is a former Aruban politician who served as the Minister of Social Affairs, Youth and Labor in the Second Eman Cabinet from 2013 to 2017. As a member of the Aruban People's Party, he was a member of the Parliament of Aruba between 2009 and 2013.

== Career ==
Croes was born in Aruba, Netherlands Antilles, on 7 November 1976. Following his primary education he attended the voorbereidend wetenschappelijk onderwijs. He then moved to the Netherlands and studied political science at the University of Amsterdam, where he obtained a degree in 2002. During his studies he specialized in international politics and international economics. Croes subsequently returned to Aruba and entered state service in the international relations department.

== Political career ==
Croes became politically active for the Aruban People's Party and in the 2009 general election he obtained a seat in the Parliament of Aruba with 1578 votes. after being sworn in he was elected as Deputy Speaker. He served as President of the Estates on 21 June 2010 and October 2013. Croes became the Parliament's youngest Speaker in history. Croes maintained his seat in the 2013 general election.

== Minister ==
Croes joined the second cabinet of Prime Minister Mike Eman as Minister of Social Affairs, Youth and Labor on 30 October 2013. Croes stated he wished to focus on child abuse, domestic violence, poverty and an increase in job productivity.

== Legal affairs ==
In January 2015 a journalist from newspaper Solo di Pueblo made allegations against Croes regarding corruption. Croes denied the allegations and demanded and received a rectification in the newspaper. Dutch newspaper de Telegraaf also reported on the case in October 2015. The Aruban cabinet subsequently denied the allegations. On 28 March 2017 it became known that Croes was a suspect in a corruption investigation regarding work permits. His house and several others were searched by local authorities, An illegal domestic worker was found at the premises. On 31 March 2017 Croes temporarily laid down his ministerial position. Minister of Finance Angel Bermudez became caretaker for his portfolio.

On 21 August 2017 Croes was arrested on suspicion of corruption. Two days after his arrest Prime Minister Eman commented that Croes would keep his position as Minister. He was released on 14 November 2017 awaiting a probable court date in April 2018. His term in office ended when the government of Evelyn Wever-Croes was sworn in on 17 November 2017, he was succeeded by Glenbert Croes.

== Conviction ==
On 22 February 2019 Croes was convicted of corruption and sentenced to 4 years imprisonment. consequentially he was barred from participating in politics and becoming a civil servant for 9 years. Croes announced his intention to appeal the decision.
