= 2005 Aruban general election =

← 2001	23 September 2005	2009 →

All 21 seats in Parliament 11 seats needed for a majority
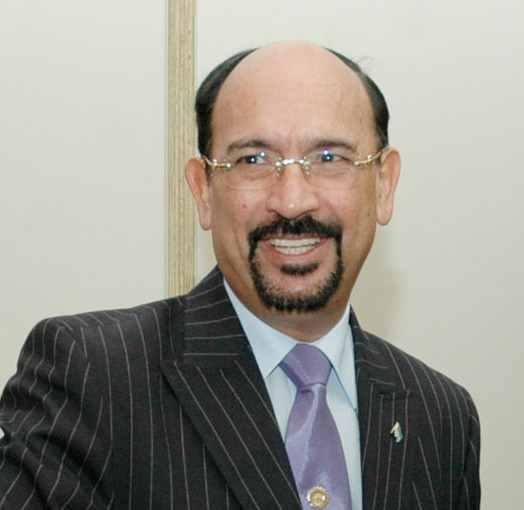

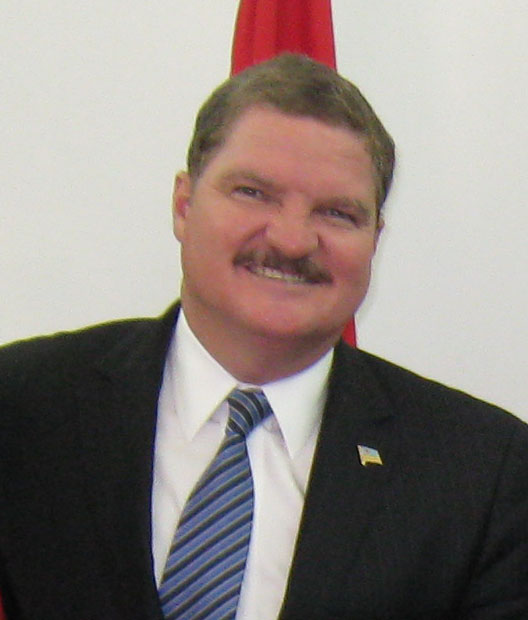
	First party	Second party
Leader	Nelson Oduber	Mike Eman
Party	PEM	AVP
Seats before	12	6
Seats won	11	8
Seat change	▼1	▲2
Popular vote	22,002	16,725
Percentage	42.87%	32.59%
Swing	▼9.61	▲6.01
	Third party	Fourth party
	MPA
Leader		Rudy Lampe
Party	MPA	RED
Seats before	—	—
Seats won	1	1
Seat change	New	New
Popular vote	3,661	3,330
Percentage	7.13%	6.49%
Swing	New	New
Prime Minister before election
Nelson Oduber
PEM
Elected Prime Minister
Nelson Oduber
PEM

General elections were held in Aruba on 23 September 2005. They were won by the People's Electoral Movement, which took 11 of the 21 seats in the Estates.

== Results ==
Party	Votes	%	Seats	+/–
People's Electoral Movement	22,002	42.87	11	–1
Aruban People's Party	16,725	32.59	8	+2
Aruban Patriotic Movement	3,661	7.13	1	New
Democratic Network	3,330	6.49	1	New
Real Democracy	2,414	4.70	0	New
Aruban Liberal Organization	1,725	3.36	0	–1
Aruban Patriotic Party	1,092	2.13	0	–2
ADA–MSA	237	0.46	0	0
PPT/SB	131	0.26	0	0
Total	51,317	100.00	21	0
Valid votes	51,317	98.71		
Invalid/blank votes	673	1.29		
Total votes	51,990	100.00		
Registered voters/turnout	60,635	85.74		
Source: Overheid
