= Elections in Aruba =

Aruba elects a legislature on the national level. The Estates (Staten) have 21 members, elected for a four-year term by Open list Party-list proportional representation. Seats are distributed between parties that have gained at least one full quota (1/21, or approximately 4.76% of the vote) using the Hagenbach-Bischoff system (a variant of the D'Hondt method). Before becoming its own country within the Kingdom of the Netherlands, Aruba participated in elections for its Island Council and for the Aruba constituency of the parliament of the Netherlands Antilles.

Aruba has a multi-party system, with two or three strong parties and a third party that is electorally successful.

== Latest elections ==
Party	Votes	%	Seats	+/–
Aruban People's Party	17,877	32.21	9	+2
People's Electoral Movement	17,571	31.66	8	–1
FUTURO	7,349	13.24	3	New
Aruban Patriotic Party	3,538	6.38	1	+1
RAIZ	2,323	4.19	0	–2
Accion 21	2,204	3.97	0	–1
Aruban Sovereignty Movement	1,722	3.10	0	–2
Fight for Reform	1,349	2.43	0	New
Democratic Network	635	1.14	0	0
Youth Bringing Change	505	0.91	0	0
United Christians Strengthening Aruba's Potential	423	0.76	0	0
Total	55,496	100.00	21	0
Valid votes	55,496	98.27		
Invalid/blank votes	976	1.73		
Total votes	56,472	100.00		
Registered voters/turnout	69,824	80.88		
Source: Electoral Council

== See also ==
- Electoral calendar
- Electoral system
