= 2013 Aruban general election =

← 2009	27 September 2013	2017 →

All 21 seats in Parliament 11 seats needed for a majority
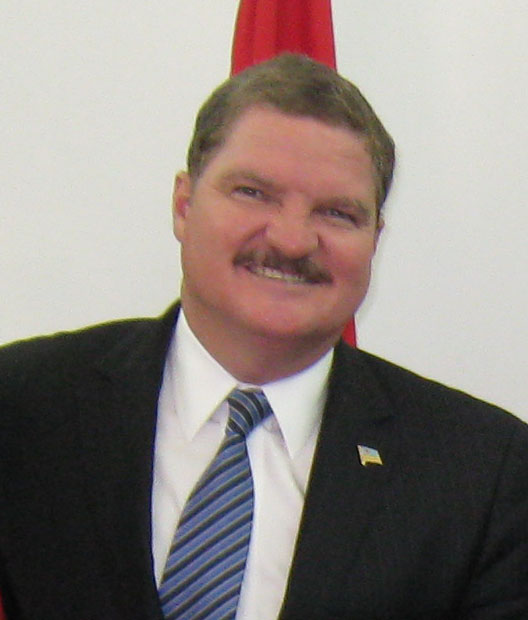

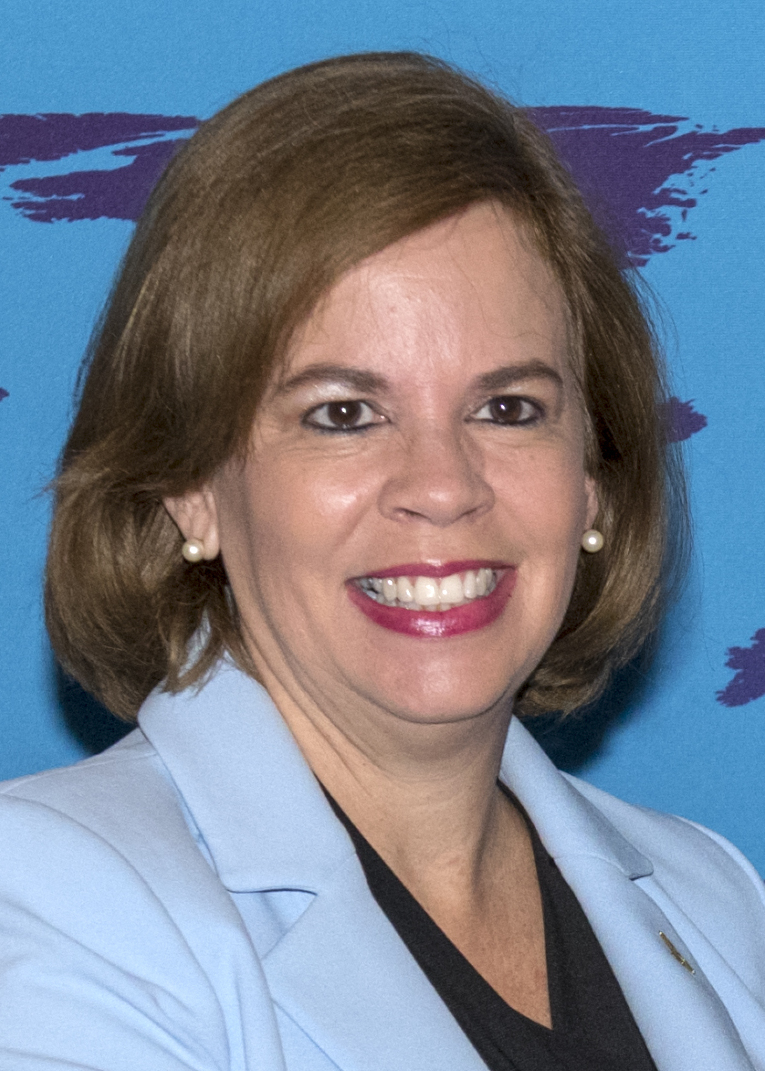
	First party	Second party	Third party
			PDR
Leader	Mike Eman	Evelyn Wever-Croes	Andin Bikker
Party	AVP	PEM	PDR
Seats before	12	8	1
Seats won	13	7	1
Seat change	▲1	▼1	Steady
Popular vote	33,103	17,653	4,518
Percentage	57.28%	30.54%	7.82%
Swing	▲9.25	▼5.39	▲2.12
Prime Minister before election
Mike Eman
APP
Elected Prime Minister
Mike Eman
APP

General elections were held in Aruba on 27 September 2013. The result was a victory for the ruling Aruban People's Party, which won 13 of the 21 seats in the Estates.

== Electoral system ==
The 21 members of the Estates were elected by open list proportional representation in a single nationwide constituency.

== Results ==
Party	Votes	%	Seats	+/–
Aruban People's Party	33,103	57.28	13	+1
People's Electoral Movement	17,653	30.54	7	–1
Real Democracy	4,518	7.82	1	0
Network of Electoral Democracy	1,209	2.09	0	0
Patriotic Progressive Union	805	1.39	0	New
Aruban Patriotic Party	506	0.88	0	0
Total	57,794	100.00	21	0
Valid votes	57,794	99.05		
Invalid/blank votes	556	0.95		
Total votes	58,350	100.00		
Registered voters/turnout	68,758	84.86		
Source: Overheid
