= 1993 Aruban general election =

- 8 January 1993

All 21 seats in Parliament 11 seats needed for a majority
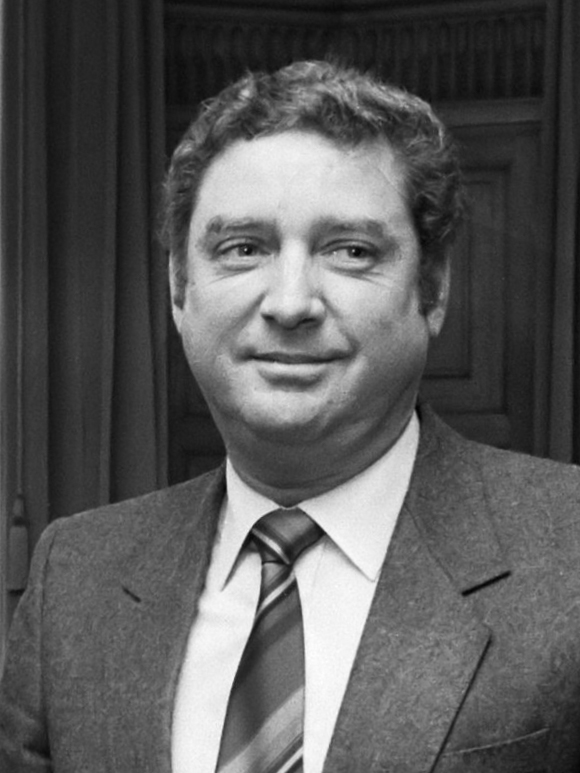

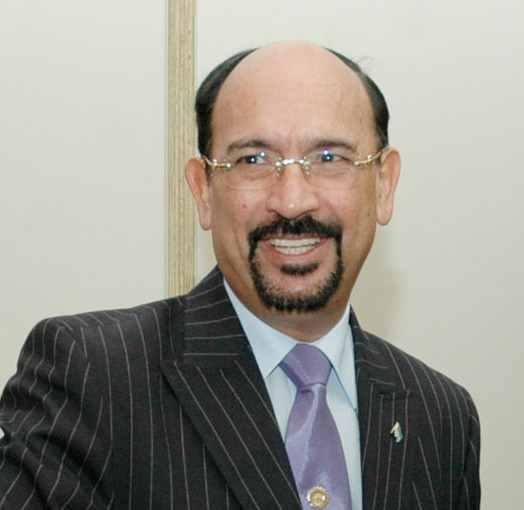
	First party	Second party	Third party
			OLA
Leader	Henny Eman	Nelson Oduber
Party	AVP	PEM	OLA
Seats before	8	10	—
Seats won	9	9	1
Seat change	▲1	▼1	New
Popular vote	15,621	14,907	3,056
Percentage	39.19%	37.39%	7.67%
Swing	▲4.02pp	▼8.56pp	New
	Fourth party	Fifth party
	ADN	PPA
Party	ADN	PPA
Seats before	1	1
Seats won	1	1
Seat change	Steady	Steady
Popular vote	2,314	2,094
Percentage	5.80%	5.25%
Swing	▼0.58pp	▲0.33pp
Prime Minister before election
Nelson Oduber
PEM
Elected Prime Minister
Nelson Oduber
PEM

General elections were held in Aruba on 8 January 1993. The Aruban People's Party and People's Electoral Movement (MEP) both won nine seats in the 21-seat Estates. The MEP remained in government with a three-party coalition headed by Nelson Oduber as Prime Minister.

== Results ==
Party	Votes	%	Seats	+/–
Aruban People's Party	15,621	39.18	9	+1
People's Electoral Movement	14,907	37.39	9	–1
Aruban Liberal Organization	3,056	7.67	1	New
National Democratic Alliance	2,314	5.80	1	0
Aruban Patriotic Party	2,094	5.25	1	0
New Patriotic Party	1,075	2.70	0	–1
Aruban Democratic Party	403	1.01	0	0
Corona	397	1.00	0	New
Total	39,867	100.00	21	0
Valid votes	39,867	99.07		
Invalid/blank votes	373	0.93		
Total votes	40,240	100.00		
Registered voters/turnout	45,680	88.09		
Source: Caribbean Elections, Aruba Blue Pages
