= 2001 Aruban general election =

| ← 1997 | 28 September 2001 | 2005 → |

All 21 seats in Parliament 11 seats needed for a majority
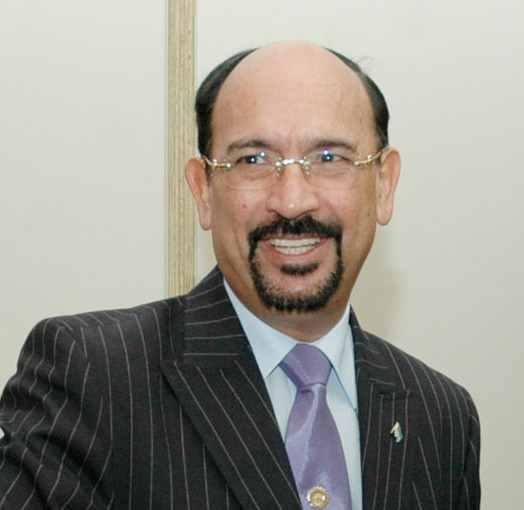

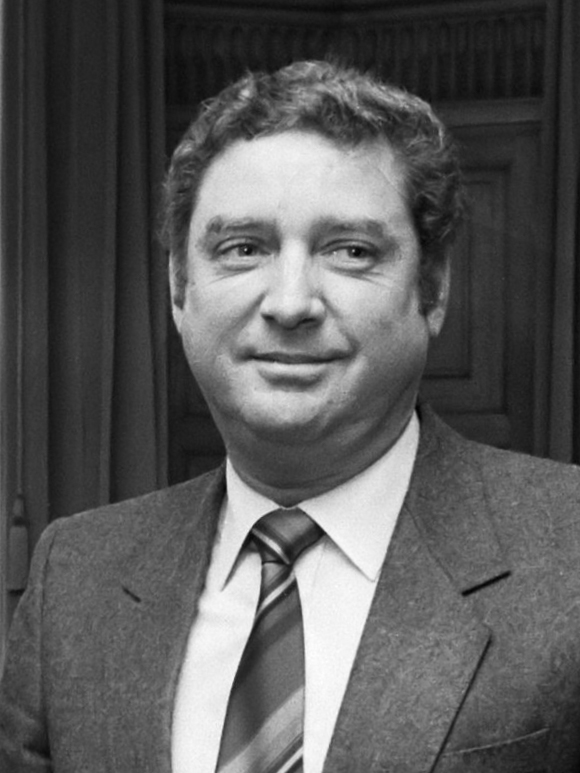
| | First party | Second party |
|---|---|---|
| Leader | Nelson Oduber | Henny Eman |
| Party | PEM | AVP |
| Seats before | 9 | 10 |
| Seats won | 12 | 6 |
| Seat change | ▲3 | ▼4 |
| Popular vote | 25,172 | 12,749 |
| Percentage | 52.48% | 26.58% |
| Swing | ▲13.68 | ▼16.95 |
| | Third party | Fourth party |
| | PPA | OLA |
| Party | PPA | OLA |
| Seats before | 0 | 2 |
| Seats won | 2 | 1 |
| Seat change | ▲2 | ▼1 |
| Popular vote | 4,598 | 2,713 |
| Percentage | 9.59% | 5.66% |
| Swing | ▲5.00 | ▼3.23 |
Prime Minister before election
Henny Eman
AVP
Elected Prime Minister
Nelson Oduber
PEM

General elections were held in Aruba on 28 September 2001. The result was a landslide victory for the People's Electoral Movement, which won 12 of the 21 seats in the Estates.

== Results ==
| Party | Votes | % | Seats | +/– |
|---|---|---|---|---|
| People's Electoral Movement | 25,172 | 52.48 | 12 | +3 |
| Aruban People's Party | 12,749 | 26.58 | 6 | –4 |
| Aruban Patriotic Party | 4,598 | 9.59 | 2 | +2 |
| Aruban Liberal Organization | 2,713 | 5.66 | 1 | –2 |
| Aruban Democratic Alliance | 1,666 | 3.47 | 0 | New |
| Concentration for the Liberation of Aruba | 540 | 1.13 | 0 | New |
| National Democratic Alliance | 531 | 1.11 | 0 | 0 |
| Total | 47,969 | 100.00 | 21 | 0 |
| Valid votes | 47,969 | 98.77 | | |
| Invalid/blank votes | 596 | 1.23 | | |
| Total votes | 48,565 | 100.00 | | |
| Registered voters/turnout | 56,617 | 85.78 | | |
Source: Caribbean Elections, CBS
