= 1985 Aruban general election =

- 22 November 1985

All 21 seats in Parliament 11 seats needed for a majority
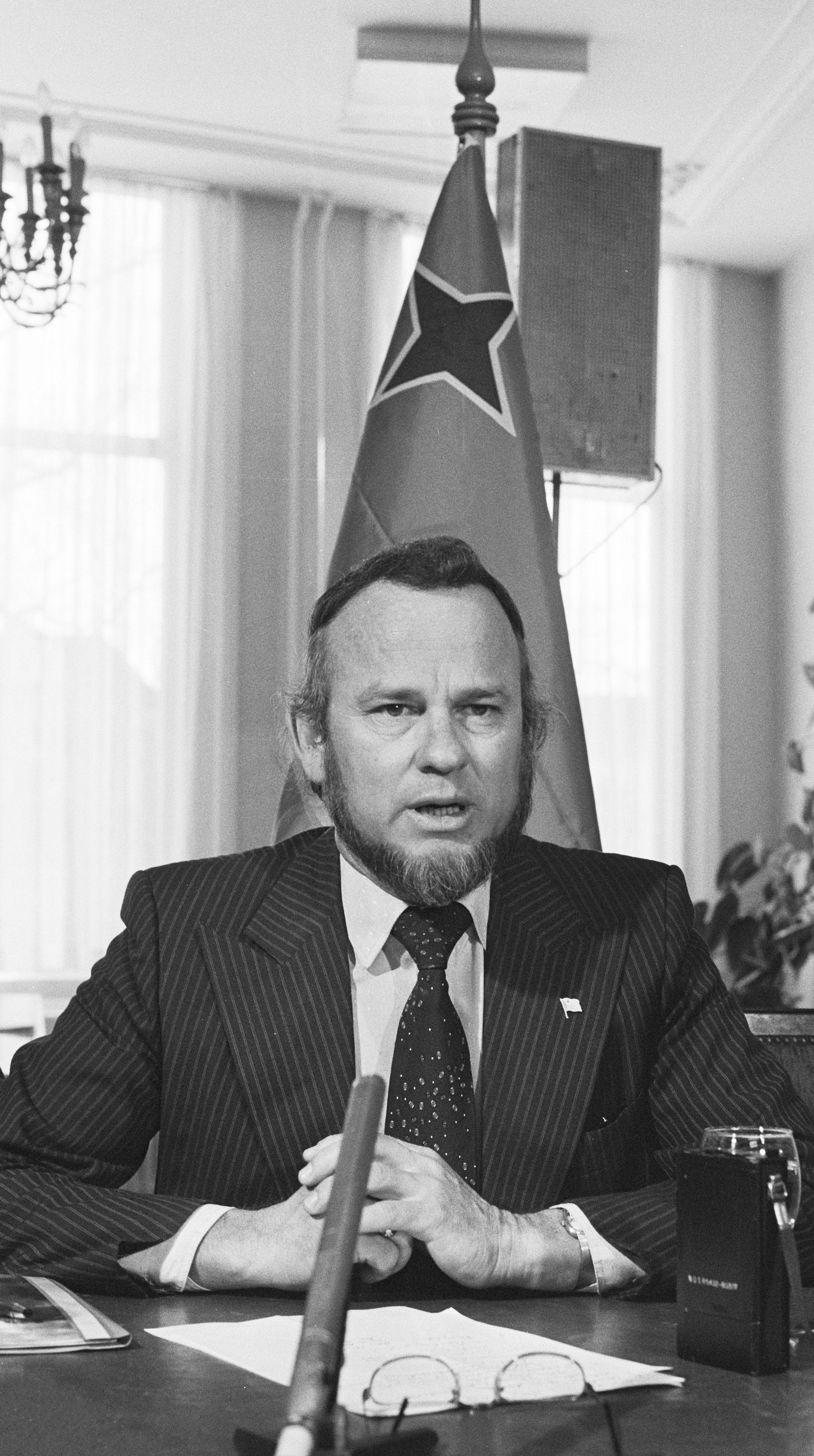

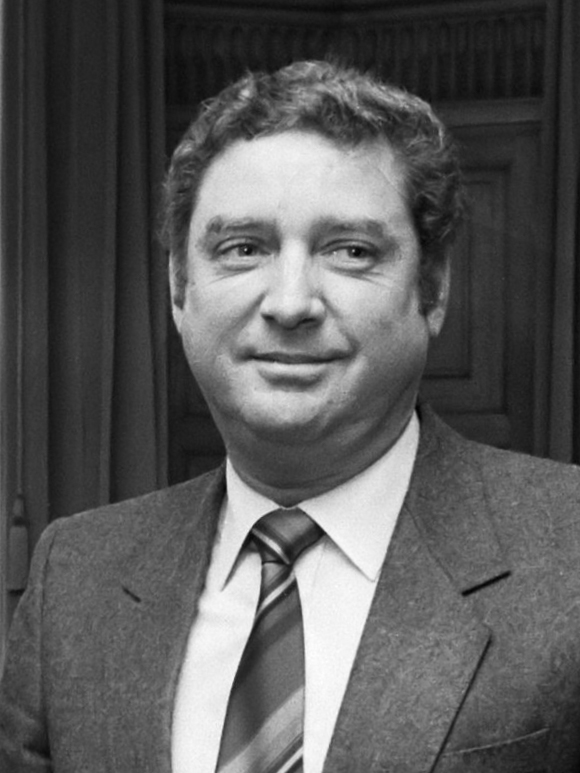
| | First party | Second party | Third party |
|---|---|---|---|
| | | | PPA |
| Leader | Betico Croes | Henny Eman |
| Party | PEM | AVP | PPA |
| Seats before | 13 | 5 | 3 |
| Seats won | 8 | 7 | 2 |
| Seat change | ▼5 | ▲2 | ▼1 |
| Popular vote | 13,786 | 11,480 | 4,499 |
| Percentage | 37.62% | 31.33% | 12.28% |
| Swing | ▼20.32pp | ▲8.76pp | ▼2.63pp |
| | Fourth party | Fifth party |
| | PDA | ADN |
| Party | PDA | ADN |
| Seats before | 0 | — |
| Seats won | 2 | 2 |
| Seat change | ▲2 | New |
| Popular vote | 3,661 | 3,216 |
| Percentage | 9.99% | 8.78% |
| Swing | ▲5.41pp | New |
Elected Prime Minister
Henny Eman
AVP

General elections were held in Aruba on 22 November 1985 to elect the Island Council. They were held shortly before Aruba was split from the Netherlands Antilles and obtained the status of a 'land' (country) within the Kingdom of the Netherlands. The Island Council was converted into the first Estates of Aruba on 1 January 1986.

Although the People's Electoral Movement won the most seats, the Aruban People's Party formed a coalition government with the Aruban Patriotic Party, Aruban Democratic Party and National Democratic Alliance, with Henny Eman becoming the first Prime Minister of Aruba.

== Results ==
| Party | Votes | % | Seats | +/– |
|---|---|---|---|---|
| People's Electoral Movement | 13,786 | 37.62 | 8 | –5 |
| Aruban People's Party | 11,480 | 31.33 | 7 | +2 |
| Aruban Patriotic Party | 4,499 | 12.28 | 2 | –1 |
| Aruban Democratic Party | 3,661 | 9.99 | 2 | New |
| National Democratic Alliance | 3,216 | 8.78 | 2 | New |
| Total | 36,642 | 100.00 | 21 | 0 |
Source: Aruba Blue Pages
