= 1997 Aruban general election =

- 12 December 1997

All 21 seats in Parliament 11 seats needed for a majority
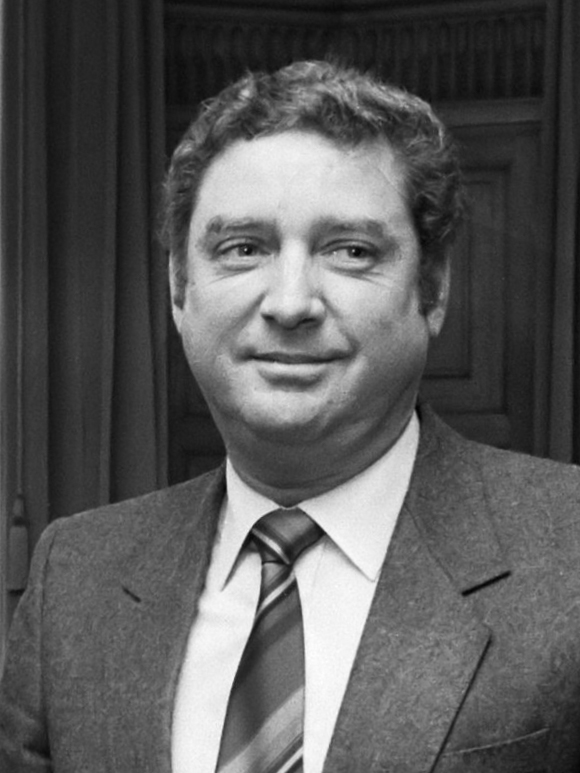

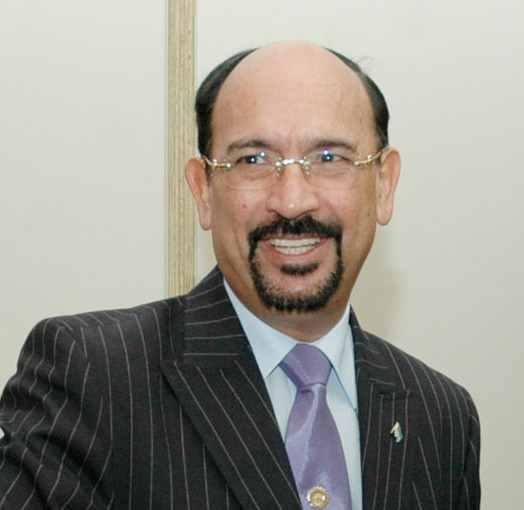
	First party	Second party	Third party
			OLA
Leader	Henny Eman	Nelson Oduber
Party	AVP	PEM	OLA
Seats before	10	9	2
Seats won	10	9	2
Seat change	Steady	Steady	Steady
Popular vote	19,476	17,358	3,976
Percentage	43.53%	38.80%	8.89%
Swing	▼1.87pp	▼0.22pp	▼2.27pp
Prime Minister before election
Henny Eman
AVP
Elected Prime Minister
Henny Eman
AVP

General elections were held in Aruba on 12 December 1997. The Aruban People's Party emerged as the largest party, winning ten of the 21 seats in the Estates.

== Results ==
Party	Votes	%	Seats	+/–
Aruban People's Party	19,476	43.53	10	0
People's Electoral Movement	17,358	38.80	9	0
Aruban Liberal Organization	3,976	8.89	2	0
National Democratic Alliance	1,092	2.44	0	New
Aruban Patriotic Party	2,052	4.59	0	0
Aruba Reform Party	519	1.16	0	New
Aruba Solidarity Movement	268	0.60	0	New
Total	44,741	100.00	21	0
Valid votes	44,741	98.71		
Invalid/blank votes	586	1.29		
Total votes	45,327	100.00		
Registered voters/turnout	52,752	85.92		
Source: Caribbean Elections, CBS
