= Aruban Democratic Party =

Aruban political party

The Aruban Democratic Party (Papiamento: Partido Democratico Arubano; PDA) is a former political party in Aruba. The party was founded in 1983 by Leonard Berlinski.

It contested elections in Aruba from 1985 to 1993, with its peak coming in 1985, when it won 9.99% of the vote and 2 of the 21 seats, when it also took part in the governing coalition.
