= Aruban Patriotic Movement =

The Aruban Patriot Movement (Movimento Patriótico Arubano, MPA) is a political party in Aruba, formed by dissidents of the Aruban Patriotic Party.

At the 2005 Aruban general election, the party won 7% of the popular vote and one out of 21 seats. The party lost its one seat in the 2009 election.
