= 2024 Aruban general election =

- 6 December 2024
- All 21 seats in Parliament; 11 seats needed for a majority
Party	Leader	Vote %	Seats	+/–
AVP	Wendrick Cicilia	32.21	9	+2
MEP	Evelyn Wever-Croes	31.66	8	−1
FUTURO	Gerlien Croes; Geoffrey Wever	13.24	3	New
PPA	Otmar Oduber	6.38	1	+1
This lists parties that won seats. See the complete results below.
Prime Minister before	Prime Minister after
Evelyn Wever-Croes; MEP	Mike Eman; AVP

Early general elections were held in Aruba on 6 December 2024 to elect all 21 members of Parliament.

== Background ==
On 9 September 2024 the Second Wever-Croes cabinet resigned following the vote for the presidency of the States of Aruba which saw Raymond Kamperveen (RAIZ) elected with the help from the opposition over the incumbent president Edgard Vrolijk (MEP), who had run for the position again. In doing so, RAIZ broke the coalition agreement with MEP, according to Prime Minister Evelyn Wever-Croes.

The fall of the government occurred approximately nine months before the general elections scheduled for June 2025. At the request of the cabinet, the governor of Aruba dissolved parliament and called early elections.

== Electoral system ==
The 21 members were elected by open list proportional representation.

== Results ==
Party	Votes	%	Seats	+/–
Aruban People's Party	17,877	32.21	9	+2
People's Electoral Movement	17,571	31.66	8	–1
FUTURO	7,349	13.24	3	New
Aruban Patriotic Party	3,538	6.38	1	+1
RAIZ	2,323	4.19	0	–2
Accion 21	2,204	3.97	0	–1
Aruban Sovereignty Movement	1,722	3.10	0	–2
Fight for Reform	1,349	2.43	0	New
Democratic Network	635	1.14	0	0
Youth Bringing Change	505	0.91	0	0
United Christians Strengthening Aruba's Potential	423	0.76	0	0
Total	55,496	100.00	21	0
Valid votes	55,496	98.27		
Invalid/blank votes	976	1.73		
Total votes	56,472	100.00		
Registered voters/turnout	69,824	80.88		
Source: Electoral Council

== Government formation ==
On 28 December the AVP and FUTURO agreed to form a new government. In accordance with a 2021 law on government integrity, negotiators from both parties were screened by the judiciary and state security services. The screening process was completed on 15 January 2025, after which the two parties began negotiating a governing agreement. Agreement was reached on 6 February, with former Prime Minister Mike Eman returning to lead the government. He was sworn in on 28 March 2025.
