= 2009 Aruban general election =

- 25 September 2009

All 21 seats in Parliament 11 seats needed for a majority
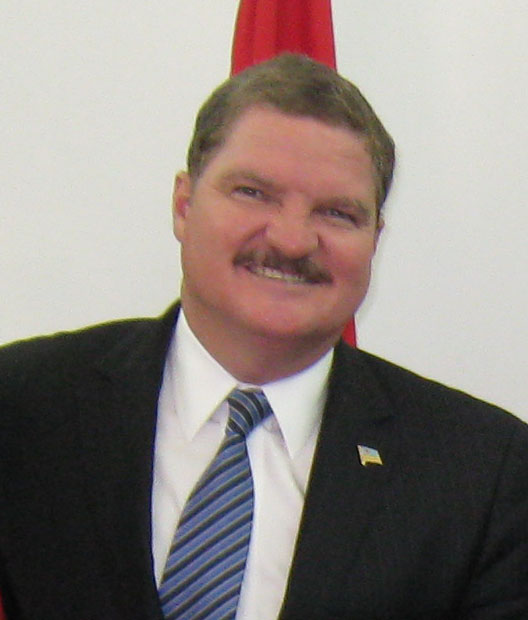

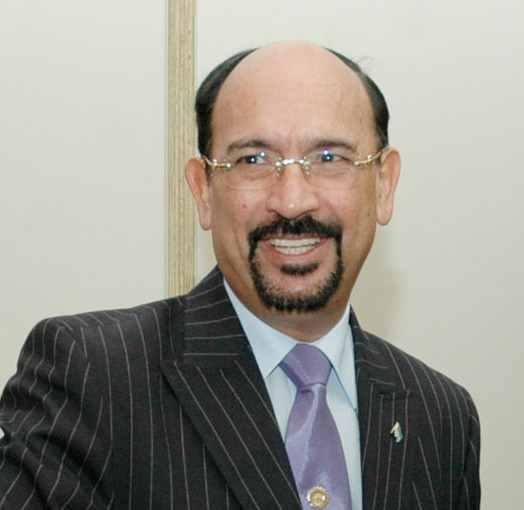
	First party	Second party	Third party
			PDR
Leader	Mike Eman	Nelson Oduber	Andin Bekker
Party	AVP	PEM	PDR
Seats before	8	11	0
Seats won	12	8	1
Seat change	▲4	▼3	▲1
Popular vote	26,476	19,804	3,144
Percentage	48.03%	35.93%	5.70%
Swing	▲15.44	▼6.94	▲1.00
Prime Minister before election
Nelson Oduber
PEM
Elected Prime Minister
Mike Eman
APP

General elections were held in Aruba on 25 September 2009. The elections were the seventh to be held for membership of the Estates since autonomy was granted by the Dutch in 1986, and resulted in a landslide victory for the Aruban People's Party, which won 12 of the 21 seats in the Estates.

== Background ==
Prior to this election the People's Electoral Movement (MEP) were the governing party, holding eleven seats. The main opposition Aruban People's Party (AVP) held eight with the Network of Electoral Democracy and the Aruban Patriotic Movement holding a seat apiece.

== Electoral system ==
The 21 members of the Estates were elected for a four-year term using proportional representation, carried out in a single nationwide constituency. Each party was allowed to place up to 29 people on their party list. The party or coalition with a majority was allowed to select a Prime Minister.

== Campaign ==
Eight parties and 167 independents contested the elections. The Aruban Director of the Register of Population and electoral council member Sharline Luidens forbade the press from taking photos inside polling stations during the election.

Pre-election polls showed the AVP were expected to win, campaigning to reduce inflation and abolish a tax on local business. The AVP also pledged to address concerns over the island's oil refinery operated by Valero Energy, which had been closed since mid-July 2009 and had provided jobs for around one thousand people, as well as a recent decline in tourists visiting the island. The People's Electoral Movement (MEP) pledged to diversify the economy and reduce debt and living costs.

The parties were represented by specific colors during the campaign; the AVP was known as the "green party," the MEP was the "yellow party" and the independent Real Democracy Party was identified as the "red party."

== Results ==
Party	Votes	%	Seats	+/–
Aruban People's Party	26,476	48.03	12	+4
People's Electoral Movement	19,804	35.93	8	–3
Real Democracy	3,144	5.70	1	+1
Aruban Patriotic Movement	2,444	4.43	0	–1
Democratic Network	2,378	4.31	0	–1
Aruban Patriotic Party	611	1.11	0	0
United Christians Reinforcing Aruba's Potential	139	0.25	0	New
MSI–OLA	125	0.23	0	0
Total	55,121	100.00	21	0
Valid votes	55,121	98.87		
Invalid/blank votes	629	1.13		
Total votes	55,750	100.00		
Registered voters/turnout	64,602	86.30		
Source: Overheid

A turnout of 86% was recorded for the election which proceeded without disruption. Governor Fredis Refunjol and his wife, Clarette, voted at the Sacred Heart School in Savaneta early Friday morning and urged all Arubans to vote as well. Incumbent Prime Minister Nelson Oduber and his wife, Glenda, cast their ballots at the EPB School in Hato, on the edge of Oranjestad. AVP leader Mike Eman voted in the afternoon at the Colegio Arubano, a junior-senior high school, with his wife, Doina, and his brother, Henny Eman, who was Aruba's first Prime Minister. Doina Eman, who is originally from the United States, had recently acquired her Dutch passport and this was the first Aruban election in which she was eligible to vote.

Polls closed in Aruba at 7:00 pm local time. Early results began filtering in approximately 8:30 pm. The first results reported in were from the Noord District, which showed a marked support for the AVP. Twelve election precincts in Oranjestad, the capital, were also won by the AVP early in the evening. The AVP, which is identified by the color green, also won eight polling stations in San Nicolas, the site of the recently closed Valero Energy oil refinery.

Support declined for Nelson Obuder's MEP party across the island. The MEP, which is known as the "yellow party", captured its traditional stronghold of Santa Cruz, as well as precincts in portions of Savaneta and Paradera. Support for the MEP ultimately dropped from eleven to eight seats in the Estates.

The AVP, led by Mike Eman, claimed 48% of the vote and twelve seats in the Estates, making Eman the 5th Prime Minister-Elect of Aruba with an absolute majority of three seats in the 21-seat House. The MEP won 36% of the vote and eight seats, with the final seat being won by the Real Democracy Party. This meant that Nelson Oduber, the demissionary Prime Minister of Aruba, had lost control of the Estates for the first time in eight years. Eman arrived at the AVP party headquarters in Oranjestad, where he was greeted by approximately 2,000 supporters dressed in green, the color of the AVP. The victory was marked by AVP supporters letting off fireworks and unfurling flags in the green livery of the party. In his speech, Eman thanked Aruba's Latino and Haitian communities. The winning party of an Aruban election traditionally celebrates with a parade following the election.

== Reactions ==
Oduber blamed the MEP's defeat on Dutch interference in Aruba's affairs, in particular referring to a recent announcement that the Dutch authorities would commence an investigation into corruption on the island. Oduber also singled out Valero Energy CEO Bill Klesse, accusing him of taking sides in the election against the MEP by closing the refinery shortly before the election took place. In a speech carried only on Aruban Channel 22, Oduber did not congratulate the winning AVP. Instead, he said that the AVP should work to fulfill its "unreal promise" to Arubans.
