= 2017 Aruban general election =

← 2013	22 September 2017	2021 →
- All 21 seats in Parliament; 11 seats needed for a majority
Party	Leader	Vote %	Seats	+/–
AVP	Mike Eman	39.86	9	−4
PEM	Evelyn Wever-Croes	37.61	9	+2
POR	Otmar Oduber	9.43	2	New
RED	Ricardo Croes	7.10	1	+1
This lists parties that won seats. See the complete results below.
Prime Minister before	Prime Minister after
Mike Eman; APP	Evelyn Wever-Croes; PEM

General elections were held in Aruba on 22 September 2017.

== Electoral system ==
The 21 members of the Estates were elected by proportional representation.

== Results ==
Party	Votes	%	Seats	+/–
Aruban People's Party	23,376	39.86	9	–4
People's Electoral Movement	22,061	37.61	9	+2
Proud and Respected People	5,531	9.43	2	New
Democratic Network	4,166	7.10	1	+1
RAIZ	2,107	3.59	0	New
Patriotic Progressive Union–Aruban Patriotic Party	656	1.12	0	0
Cristiannan Uni Reforzando Potencial di Aruba	468	0.80	0	New
Aruban Sovereignty Movement	287	0.49	0	New
Total	58,652	100.00	21	0
Valid votes	58,652	98.74		
Invalid/blank votes	751	1.26		
Total votes	59,403	100.00		
Registered voters/turnout	70,750	83.96		
Source: Overheid
