= 2021 Aruban general election =

- 25 June 2021
- All 21 seats in Parliament; 11 seats needed for a majority
Party	Leader	Vote %	Seats	+/–
MEP	Evelyn Wever-Croes	35.32	9	0
AVP	Mike Eman	31.28	7	−2
RAIZ	Ursell Arends	9.34	2	+2
MAS	Marisol Lopez-Tromp	7.99	2	+2
Accion 21	Miguel Mansur	5.82	1	New
This lists parties that won seats. See the complete results below.
Prime Minister before	Prime Minister after
Evelyn Wever-Croes; PEM	Evelyn Wever-Croes; PEM

General elections were held in Aruba on 25 June 2021 to elect all 21 members of Parliament. The elections were originally scheduled to take place in September 2021, but were brought forward following the resignation of the government after a criminal investigation was opened against one of the governing coalition parties, Proud and Respected People, for embezzling government money.

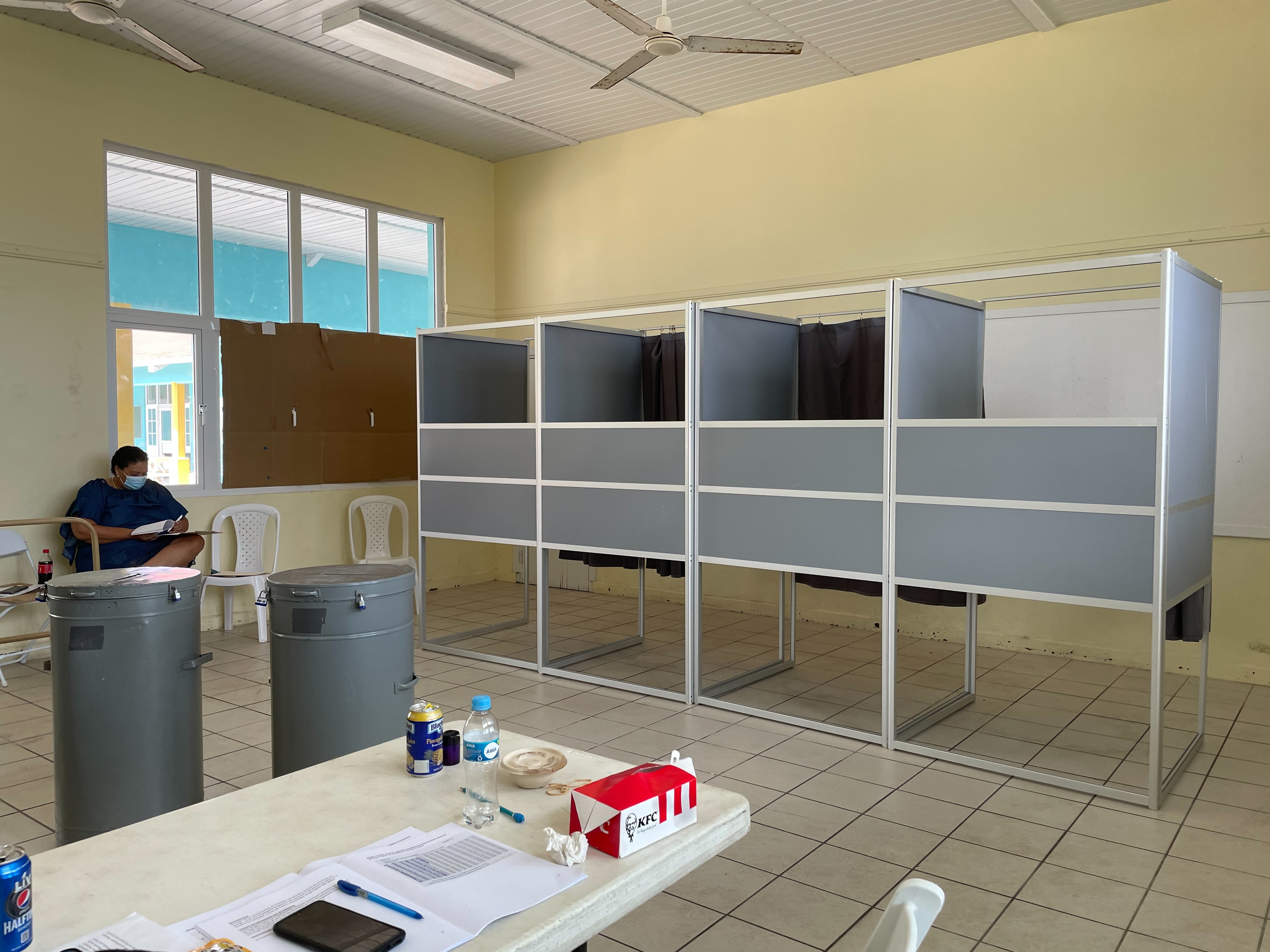
Polling station

== Electoral system ==
The 21 members were elected via open list proportional representation.

== Results ==
Party	Votes	%	Seats	+/–
People's Electoral Movement	20,700	35.32	9	0
Aruban People's Party	18,335	31.28	7	–2
RAIZ	5,474	9.34	2	+2
Aruban Sovereignty Movement	4,681	7.99	2	+2
Accion 21	3,410	5.82	1	New
Aruban Patriotic Party	1,809	3.09	0	0
Democratic Network	1,784	3.04	0	–1
Proud and Respected People	661	1.13	0	–2
Patriotic Progressive Union	621	1.06	0	0
People First	574	0.98	0	New
United Christians Strengthening Aruba's Potential	312	0.53	0	0
Youth Bringing Change	249	0.42	0	New
Total	58,610	100.00	21	0
Valid votes	58,610	98.50		
Invalid/blank votes	890	1.50		
Total votes	59,500	100.00		
Registered voters/turnout	70,283	84.66		
Source: Censo
