= William R. Klesse =

- Born: 1947 (age 78–79); Chatham, NJ

William "Bill" R. Klesse (born 1947, Chatham, NJ) is the former chairman of the board for Valero Energy Corporation. He was chief executive officer from December 31, 2005, to April 30, 2014, and President from January 17, 2008, to December 31, 2012. He previously held positions with Valero as Vice Chairman of the Board, Executive Vice President, and Chief Operating Officer. Prior to that time, he was the Chief Operating Officer of Valero Energy Corp. from January 2003 to January 3, 2006. Before these roles, he was Executive Vice President-Refining and Commercial Operations, from Valero's acquisition of Ultramar Diamond Shamrock Corporation (UDS) in 2001. Klesse has been employed with Valero and its predecessor companies for 40 years.

Klesse graduated from the University of Dayton with a Bachelor of Science in Chemical Engineering. He received a master's degree in finance from West Texas A&M University.

== Compensation ==
As the CEO of Valero Energy Corporation, Klesse earned a total compensation of $6,638,187 in 2008, which included a base salary of $1,500,000, a cash bonus of $705,510, stocks granted of $2,058,846, options granted of $2,235,337, and other compensation of $138,494. In 2009, Klesse earned a total compensation of $10,906,821, which included a base salary of $1,500,000, no cash bonus, stocks granted of $4,905,200, options granted of $4,306,896, and other compensation of $194,725. His total compensation for 2011 was $11,027,067.
