= Alfonso Boekhoudt =

Aruban politician (born 1965)

His Excellency Alfonso Boekhoudt

4th Governor of Aruba
- Incumbent
- Assumed office 1 January 2017
- Monarch: Willem-Alexander
- Prime Minister: Mike Eman; Evelyn Wever-Croes; Mike Eman
- Preceded by: Fredis Refunjol

Minister Plenipotentiary of Aruba
- In office 14 November 2013 – 17 November 2016
- Prime Minister: Mike Eman
- Preceded by: Edwin Abath
- Succeeded by: Juan David Yrausquin

Personal details
- Born: 27 January 1965 (age 61) Aruba, Netherlands Antilles

Juan Alfonso Boekhoudt (Papiamento pronunciation: [ˈʒwan alˈfɔnso buˈkhɑwt]; born 27 January 1965) is an Aruban politician who has been serving as the 4th governor of Aruba since 2017. He previously served as minister plenipotentiary from 14 November 2013 to 17 November 2016.

== Biography ==
Boekhoudt was born on Aruba on 27 January 1965. Between 1991 and 1994, he worked in the cabinet of the minister plenipotentiary of Aruba. From 1994 to 2005 he worked as financial manager and director in the private sector. He served as director of the Aruba Ports Authority between 2005 and 2013. He also served as the chairman of the Aruba Red Cross between October 2010 and November 2013.

He was appointed as minister plenipotentiary of Aruba per 13 November 2013, he succeeded Edwin Abath. Boekhoudt was succeeded by Juan David Yrausquin on 17 November 2016.

== Appointment as governor ==
In October 2016, the Council of Ministers of the Kingdom of the Netherlands appointed Boekhoudt as governor of Aruba per 1 January 2017. He was nominated by the Dutch minister of the interior and kingdom relations, Ronald Plasterk.

The move drew criticism from the Aruban cabinet, which stated that the rules of the Council of Ministers of the kingdom regarding gubernatorial appointments had not been followed. With the Aruban cabinet wishing that the appointment was reversed. The Dutch Ministry of the Interior and Kingdom Relations stated that the rules had been followed. The Aruban cabinet had nominated Finance Minister Angel Bermudez for the position.

The Aruban cabinet subsequently withdrew confidence in Boekhoudt, forcing him to resign as minister plenipotentiary of Aruba per 1 November 2016. On 18 October the conflict between Eman and Plasterk was settled, with Eman accepting the appointment of Boekhoudt, with the parties jointly declaring that the process was not handled perfectly.

Government offices
| Preceded by Fredis Refunjol | Governor of Aruba; 2017–present | Incumbent |
