= Aruban Sovereignty Movement =

Aruban Sovereignty Movement Movimiento Arubano Soberano
- Abbreviation: MAS
- Leader: Marisol Lopez-Tromp
- Founder: Holmo Henriquez
- Founded: 17 September 2015
- Ideology: Social democracy, Aruban Independence
- Political position: Centre-left
- Colours: Light blue
- Parliament of Aruba: 0 / 21

Website
- masaruba.com

The Aruban Sovereignty Movement (Papiamento: Movimiento Arubano Soberano; Dutch: Arubaanse Souvereiniteitsbeweging; MAS) is an Aruban political party. The party was founded on 17 September 2015 by Holmo Henriquez, entrepreneur, who also became party leader. The party is in favor of giving citizens more power through participation, regardless of who runs the country.

== Participation in elections ==
MAS debuted in the 2017 elections. In the primary, the party passed the required threshold of 551 declarations of support; however, this number was nearly halved to 287 votes in the vote. With this result, the party remained outside parliament and Henriquez indicated that he wanted to resign from politics. On April 21, 2021, Marisol Lopez-Tromp, former minister on behalf of the POR, took over the party leadership. With a short list of candidates, the MAS managed to win 4,681 votes and two state seats in the 2021 general election.

== Election results ==
=== Aruba general elections ===
Election	Leader	Votes	%	Seats	+/–	Status
2017	Marisol Lopez-Tromp	287	0.49 (#8)	0 / 21	New	Extra-parliamentary
2021	Marisol Lopez-Tromp	4,681	7.99 (#4)	2 / 21	▲2	Opposition
2024	Marisol Lopez-Tromp	1,722	3.10 (#7)	0 / 21	▼2	Extra-parliamentary
