= Colegio Arubano =

Coordinates: 12.5131°N 70.0263°W

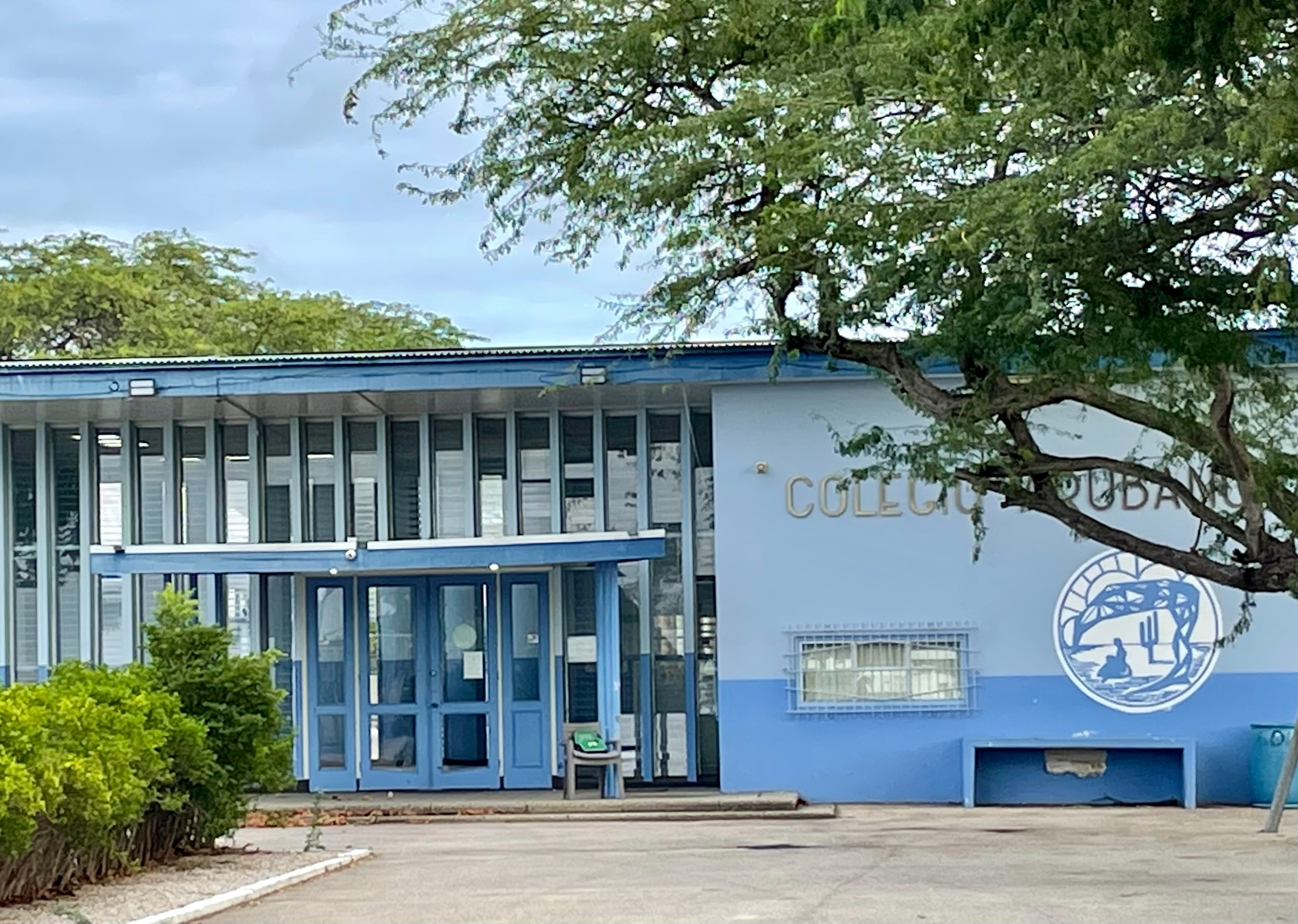
- Vondellaan 14, Oranjestad; Aruba

Information
- Established: 1959
- Director: Ryma van der Linde
- Enrollment: +/- 1100
- Campus: Oranjestad
- Website: colegioarubano.aw

Colegio Arubano (English: Aruban High School) is a secondary school in Aruba that serves students in grades seven through twelve (measured in Ciclo Basico as equivalents to seventh and eighth grades and in VWO [four-year program] / HAVO [three-year program] as equivalents to American high school grades nine through twelve) from one of its two campuses in either the capital city of Oranjestad or the southern community of Sint Nicolaas. The two campuses have been separated now, and the school in Sint Nicolaas has become a different school with the new name Colegio Nigel Matthew.

== About ==
On 15 February 2008, demonstrations took place surrounding the quality of education in Colegio Arubano and other schools on the island of Aruba; a 2007 study in the Colegio Arubano student body indicated that about 70% of students graduate from lower grade feeder schools and are eligible to enter Colegio Arubano. 72% of students participating in VWO pass final exams, whilst 65% of all HAVO students pass the HAVO final exam.

The under-directors are M. Maduro, M. Boekhoudt-Wernet, and L. Gemerts.

The school had around 100 teachers and 1657 students as of 2019.

The school teaches the Papiamento, Dutch, English, Spanish and French languages. When a student is going from the third grade to the fourth grade, the student may choose their subjects. For the HAVO section the student must choose from three different courses, or profiles: MM: Mens En Maatschappij (Economy, Management & Organisation, Statistics, Math and History), NW: Natuurwetenschappen (Math, Physics, Biology and Chemistry), and HU: Humaniora (Spanish, History, Geography, Economics and Drama classes). VWO students are not eligible to opt for the Humaniora course. Each subject combination has a compulsory specialized component which includes a project relating to the pupil’s specialized subjects. In addition, students choose one or two optional subjects relating to their subject combination and one other optional subject. For their school leaving examinations, HAVO pupils take seven subjects and VWO pupils take eight.

Starting May 1, 2015, former director and biology teacher left Colegio Arubano. H. Timmermans became the new director and Dutch professor. After the first month into his new position, students protested against the new director. Timmermans left Colegio Arubano in mid-December 2015 without an explanation. In March 2016 his contract was terminated. From 2018 to 2020 Michella van Loon was the director of Colegio Arubano. In 2020, Tim Croes became the director of Colegio Arubano.

Classes start at 7:30 am, but the last hour of school is different for every class and depends largely on the profile of each individual student. Students from VWO 3 (9th grade), HAVO 4 (10th grade) and on, generally will have school time from 7:30 am to 1:25 pm or 2:10 pm and occasionally to 3:00 pm. Every period lasts 45 minutes, with the exception of the week in which the teachers and mentors of the students come together and discuss the report cards. In that week all periods are cut with 10 minutes. This usually happens the week before the report cards are given to the parents, in which this period every class lasts 35 minutes.

Certain subjects such as CKV (Acting/Dance/Music/Painting class) and LO (physical education) which are given once a week occur in a two-period timespan, thus lasting one hour and thirty minutes. Other subjects are also often given this, commonly subjects relevant to the grade or depending on the difficulty of the material dealt with during that specific year. The number of hours given to each subject is generally equal to all classes of the same grade, with certain differences between HAVO and VWO.

English, Dutch and mathematics are considered to be the most principal and essential subjects.

== Admission ==
Admission to Colegio Arubano is known to be tenacious. Potential students take part in rigorous testing on the fields of mathematics and the Dutch language. The admission exam was utilized to test the academic level of the potential students, and to control and limit the number of students admitted into the school, owing to the limited capacity of availability the school has to offer.

The admission exam was heavily critiqued and debated because the test was considered strenuous and was also considered what many thought to be 'a snapshot of the academic performance of elementary students', leading in distorted results of the admission exam. It is believed an estimated three quarters would pass the exam.

As of the academic year 2019-2020, the Ministry of Education conjoined with the Department of Education of Aruba, is introducing a Domestic Continuance Exam for all elementary school students. The domestic exam will replace the admission exam of Colegio Arubano. The Domestic Continuance Exam, in addition to the elementary school teacher of the particular elementary school student will establish the eligibility of the student to continue onward to the school of their particular level. It is believed that the number of students admitted to the school due to the newly introduced Domestic Continuance Exam will strongly increase.

== Periods ==
	Period	Duration
07:30 - 08:15	1	00:45
08:15 - 09:00	2	00:45
09:00 - 09:45	3	00:45
09:45 - 10:30	4	00:45
10:30 - 10:55	Recess	00:25
10:55 - 11:40	5	00:45
11:40 - 12:25	6	00:45
12:25 - 12:40	Recess	00:15
12:40 - 13:25	7	00:45
13:25 - 14:10	8	00:45

This schedule is in rotation every workday of the week. Student schedules differ.

== Festivities ==
Several national holidays are observed and celebrated. On nationally celebrated days, such as Dia di Betico, which commemorates the birth of Gilberto Francois "Betico" Croes on 25 January, all schools are closed.

Every year, during the celebration of carnival, class queens are chosen from the different grades and compete for the crown of the school queen.

The Key Club branch of Kiwanis Aruba on Colegio Arubano organizes several events, such as the selling of roses, candy and stuffed animals for Valentine's Day; bake sales; and fundraising for charity.

Another festivity which has risen in popularity in recent years are the water balloon fights. These are coordinated by students of different grades, albeit often happening on the last day of school for the ones who have finished their exams successfully or on the last day of school in general. These fights have been going on for several years, each year with a new twist. On the last official school day in 2014, balloons were prepared early in the morning, some containing glitter or ink. These 'fights' are often harmless and enjoyable. Bottles are also filled with water and emptied on laughing or surprised students as a second resort for balloons.

As of 2019, the water balloon fights are prohibited because these festivities pose a safety hazard to students.

== HAVO/VWO ==
Ciclo Basico (Elemental Program) consists of the CB1 (7th grade) and CB2 (8th grade). The academic performance of the student in CB2 determines whether the student is admitted to the three-year HAVO program or the four-year VWO program. In the United States this stage is known as middle school.

The HAVO program is known as Senior General Secondary Education (SGSE) in the English language, and is a three-year program (9th grade through 11th grade). This program allows students to enroll in a vocational university (Hoger Beroepsonderwijs) following the completion of their high school degree.

The VWO program is known as Pre-University in the English language, and is a four-year program (9th grade through 12th grade). This program allows students to directly enroll to a university (Wetenschappelijk onderwijs) following the completion of their high school degree.

== In comparison with the U.S. education system ==
	Age^{1}	American grade^{2}	Dutch grade
Middle school	12	7	1
	13	8	2
High school	14	9	3
	15	10	4
	16	11	5*
	17	12	6**

^{1}Ages displayed may differ ± 2 years in actuality. ^{2}American Middle/High School grades.

*HAVO goes up to, and includes the 5th grade (Dutch system) **Only VWO goes up to, and includes the 6th grade (Dutch system).
