= Real Democracy =

Real Democracy Democracia Real
- Leader: Andin Bikker
- Founded: 2004
- Dissolved: 2017
- Political position: Centre-right
- International affiliation: International Democrat Union (observer)
- Colours: Red

Real Democracy (Dutch: Echte Democratie, Papiamento: Democracia Real, PDR) was a political party in Aruba.

== Election history ==
The party was founded by Andin Bikker on 20 August 2004. In the 2005 elections for the Estates on 23 September 2005, the party won 3,98% of the popular vote, but failed to win a seat.

In the 2009 elections on 25 September 2009, the party won a single seat.

In the 2013 elections, the party managed to keep their one seat. The party did not participate in the 2017 elections, instead merging with the POR party.
