= Politics of Aruba =

Aruba is a constituent country of the Kingdom of the Netherlands and a parliamentary representative democracy, whereby the governor in his capacity as the King's representative is the de jure head of government and of a multi-party system. Executive power is exercised by the government. Legislative power is vested in both the government and the Parliament. The Judiciary is independent of the executive and the legislature. Aruba has full autonomy on most matters. Exceptions are defense, foreign affairs, and the Supreme Court. The constitution was enacted in 1986.

== Executive ==
Executive power is exercised by the Aruban Cabinet on behalf of the governor, the cabinet consists out of the prime minister and other ministers. the Governor is appointed for a six-year term by the monarch which can be extended with another term.

== Legislature ==
The Parliament has 21 members, elected for a four-year term by proportional representation. Each member holds their seats until Parliament is dissolved or they resign their seat. The leader of the party who gains majority usually becomes the Prime Minister.

== Judicial ==
Aruba's judicial system, which has mainly been derived from the Dutch system, operates independently of the legislature and the executive. Jurisdiction, including appeal, lies with the Common Court of Justice of Aruba and the Netherlands Antilles and the Supreme Court of the Netherlands.
