= Evelyn Wever-Croes =

4th Prime Minister of Aruba

Her Excellency Evelyn Wever-Croes
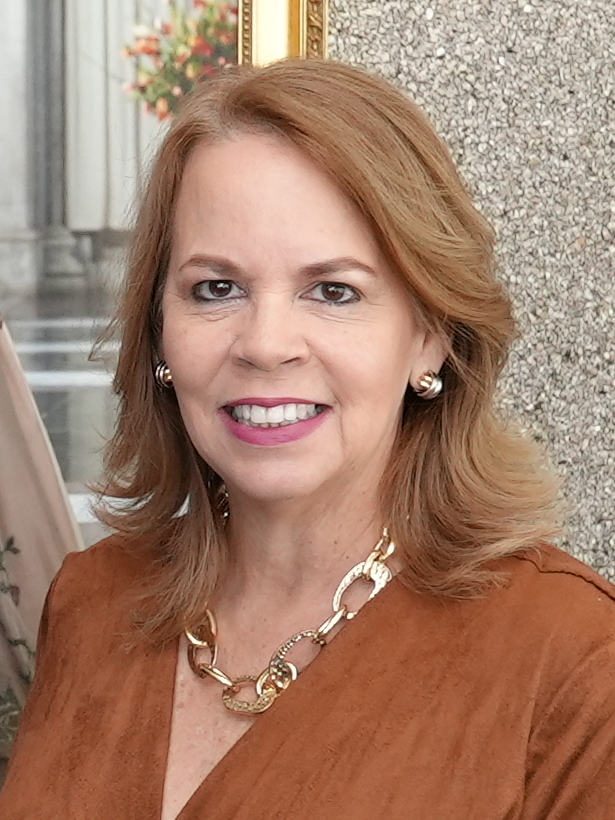
- Wever-Croes in 2022

4th Prime Minister of Aruba
- In office 17 November 2017 – 28 March 2025
- Monarch: Willem-Alexander
- Governor: Alfonso Boekhoudt
- Preceded by: Mike Eman
- Succeeded by: Mike Eman

Minister of General Affairs, Integrity, Energy and Innovation
- In office 17 November 2017 – 28 March 2025
- Monarch: Willem-Alexander
- Governor: Alfonso Boekhoudt

Leader of the People's Electoral Movement
- Incumbent
- Assumed office 28 August 2011
- Preceded by: Nelson Oduber

Member of Parliament
- Incumbent
- Assumed office 28 March 2025
- In office 29 October 2009 – 17 November 2017

Personal details
- Born: Evelyna Christina Croes; 5 December 1966 (age 59) Leiden, Netherlands
- Party: People's Electoral Movement
- Spouse: Kenneth Wever
- Education: University of The Netherlands Antilles; Leiden University

Evelyna Christina "Evelyn" Wever-Croes (born 5 December 1966) is an Aruban lawyer and politician and who served as the 4th Prime Minister of Aruba from 2017 to 2025. She is the first woman to have held the position. She is a member of the People's Electoral Movement (MEP) and has been the leader of the party since 2011.

== Early life ==
Wever-Croes was born on 5 December 1966 in Leiden, Netherlands. (Note: While her Estates biography stated she was born on Aruba, other sources indicate she was born in the Netherlands, which she has also stated herself in an interview with Radio Nederland Wereldomroep.) She is daughter of Hendrik Croes. She was born into a political family, with political activist Betico Croes and former Minister of Justice Rudy Croes being uncles of her. Wever-Croes attended the voorbereidend wetenschappelijk onderwijs at the Colegio Arubano in Oranjestad.

Wever-Croes studied Antillean law at the University of the Netherlands Antilles from 1985 to 1986. She then moved to the Netherlands and studied tax law at Leiden University from 1986 to 1989. Wever-Croes worked for the tax inspection from 1989 to 2003, working as head of the department since 1994. From 2003 she worked at a law firm as a tax adviser at Croes, Wever & Tchong until 2010, concurrently working as a lawyer since 2008.

== Early political career ==
Wever-Croes became a member of Parliament on 29 October 2009, having been elected in the 2009 elections. She was elected as leader of the People's Electoral Movement on 28 August 2011 and became parliamentary leader in 2013.

In the 2017 general election Wever-Croes' MEP obtained 9 seats. After nearly five weeks of negotiations she managed to form a coalition government under her leadership with the Pueblo Orguyoso y Respeta (POR) and Network of Electoral Democracy (RED), the first Aruban coalition government in sixteen years, and the first Aruban government headed by a woman thus subsequently becoming the first female prime minister. Wever-Croes's cabinet was sworn in by Governor Alfonso Boekhoudt on 17 November 2017. She was one of eight members of the Parliament of Aruba to resign their seats to become part of the cabinet as required by law.

== Prime minister ==
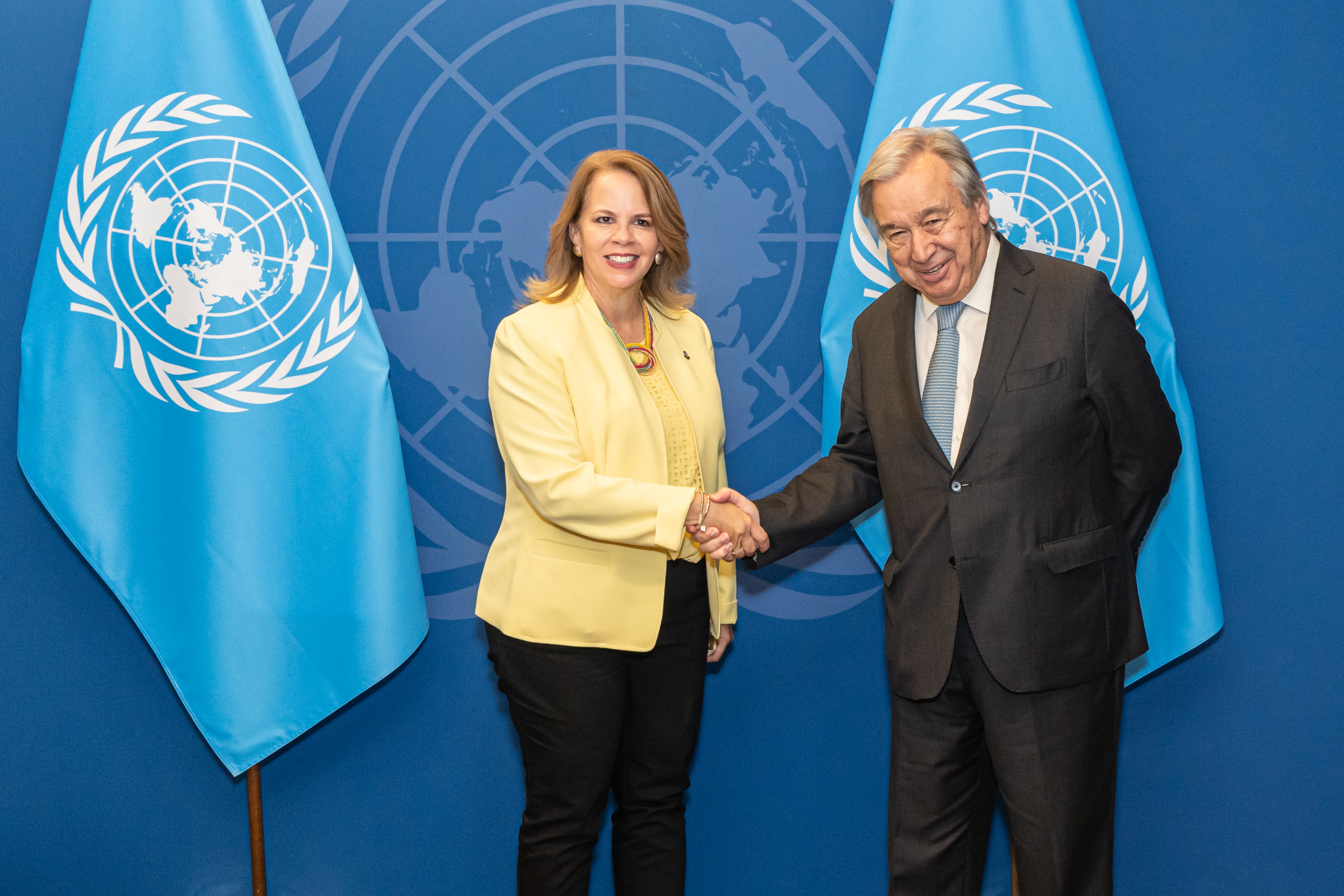
Wever-Croes meeting with UN Secretary-General António Guterres in 2022

=== First Wever-Croes cabinet ===
Wever-Croes's first cabinet was sworn in by Governor Alfonso Boekhoudt on 17 November 2017.

==== Financial policies ====
As the previous government ran a government budget deficit, Wever-Croes shortly after taking office announced that she wanted to introduce budget cuts and initiate talks with the Netherlands about future financial agreements. One of her first measures was to limit the staff attached to each minister. By the next year she had put a cap on government salaries and hoped to put forward a financial recovery plan in June, to avoid an intervention by the Dutch government. In November 2018 Aruba and the Netherlands agreed on budgetary rules for the period 2019–2021 and to have the College Aruba financieel toezicht (CAft) be in place for at least a further three years. Under Wever-Croes an accord was reached in 2019 on an Aruban fiscal council to succeed the CAft per 2021.

In October 2019, Raymond Knops, the State Secretary for the Interior and Kingdom Relations indicated he wanted to give Aruba a formal instruction in the Council of Ministers of the Kingdom of the Netherlands on advice of the CAft, as Aruba did not obey fully by the agreement made the previous year. The next month Wever-Croes flew to the Netherlands to attend the Council of Ministers of the Kingdom of the Netherlands and managed that a formal instruction was not given. In April 2020 Wever-Croes stated that she had managed to make a yearly budget saving of 27 million Aruban florin.

==== COVID-19 pandemic in Aruba ====
In order to deal with the COVID-19 pandemic in Aruba, Wever-Croes instated a curfew between 21:00 and 06:00 starting from 21 March 2020. When she took the measure five persons had tested positive on the island. She also introduced a measure that temporarily banned Aruban residents from returning to the country from abroad.

During 2020, the financial position of Aruba was severely affected due to the impact of the COVID-19 pandemic in Aruba, with government revenue falling by 80%. In response the Wever-Croes cut salaries of higher government officials and civil servants by 20% for the period May until December, while also lowering the salaries of regular civil servants with 12.6%. In April 2020 she introduced the Wever-Croes standard, which permanently limited the salary of directors of state run enterprises up till 130% of the salary of the Prime Minister.

In March 2020, Wever-Croes asked the Netherlands to be supported by a gift of 400 million Euro. The Netherlands rejected the wish and stated it would help but not via the form of a gift. On 16 May, Wever-Croes agreed to a first financial aid package subject to certain conditions. By July 2020 Wever-Croes was in negotiations with the Netherlands for a third financial aid package and received a list of 18 new conditions for reforms set by the Netherlands. She wrote a complaint letter to Dutch Prime Minister Mark Rutte on the severity of the terms, stating: "It's almost as if Aruba has become the country-version of the American George Floyd and our own Mitch Henriquez. Mark, we can't breathe like this". Wever-Croes, with the leaders of Curaçao and Sint Maarten shortly afterwards rejected the terms the Netherlands had set. Over July and August Aruba did not receive financing from the Netherlands. In September 2020 the Wever-Croes government obtained 171 million Aruban florin on the local market. The financial negotiations with the Netherlands were still ongoing during October 2020. Mid-November she reached an agreement with the Netherlands, which comprised both short and long term financial support as well as the founding of a "Caribbean entity" charged with handling reforms in governance, finances, education and health care. The agreement also included help of the Netherlands with Aruban debts, allowing for interest benefits. Wever-Croes stated that the Caribbean entity would not take over competences from the Aruban government.

In early October 2020, Wever-Croes stated that financial support measures for businesses would be continued for a further three months.

==== Other policies ====
Wever-Croes has stated that she sees it as priority to have more women run for political office.

By mid 2018, Aruba was faced with around 5,000 Venezuelans who had fled their country. Wever-Croes stated that the Netherlands was "indifferent" about the influx. Dutch Prime Minister Mark Rutte stated that Aruba is an autonomous country within the Kingdom of the Netherlands and that Aruba should request aid if it needs it.

=== Second Wever-Croes cabinet ===
Wever-Croes's cabinet was sworn in for her second term by Governor Alfonso Boekhoudt on 21 September 2021.

In the aftermath of the 2024 Aruban general election, the AVP and FUTURO agreed to form a new government, meaning Mike Eman returned to lead the government. He was sworn in on 28 March 2025.

== Personal life ==
Wever-Croes is married to Kenneth Wever. She has a son and she is a grandmother.

In October 2020, Wever-Croes stated that she received a security detail after death threats were made against her.
