= Aruban People's Party =

Aruban People's Party Arubaanse Volkspartij (Dutch) Partido di Pueblo Arubano (Papiamento)
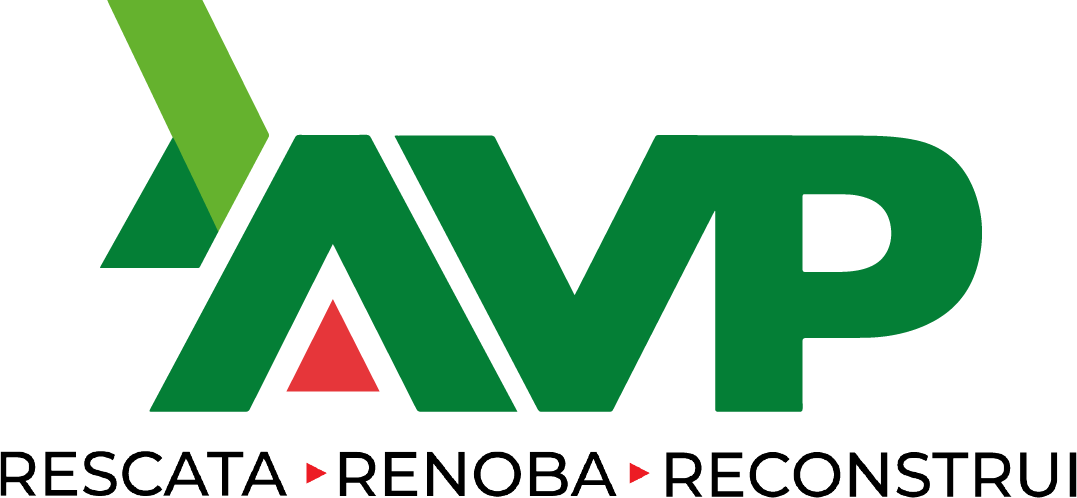
- Leader: Mike Eman
- Founder: Henny Eman
- Founded: 1942
- Ideology: Aruban regionalism Conservatism; Christian democracy
- Political position: Centre-right
- Regional affiliation: Christian Democrat Organization of America
- International affiliation: Centrist Democrat International
- Colours: Green
- Parliament of Aruba: 9 / 21

Website
- AVP.aw

The Aruban People's Party (AVP; Dutch: Arubaanse Volkspartij, Papiamento: Partido di Pueblo Arubano) is a Christian-democratic political party in Aruba. The AVP was founded by Henny Eman in 1942, and the party sought autonomy for Aruba from the Netherlands Antilles.

Every government in Aruban history since 1985 has been formed by either the AVP or People's Electoral Movement. After the 2024 election the AVP currently leads a coalition with FUTURO.

== History ==
The Aruban People’s Party was formed in 1942, by Henny Eman and sought independence from the Netherlands Antilles, but not the Netherlands. The AVP found its support from native Arubans while the Aruban Patriotic Party found its support among immigrants. Members of the AVP who were more supportive of separatism broke away in the 1970s to form the People's Electoral Movement (MEP). AVP and Reformistanan Uni Pa Bienestar (RUBA) merged for the 1983 elections, but their combined seat total fell from 6 to 5.

Aruba became an autonomous constituent country. The 1985 general election, the first one after autonomy was given to Aruba, produced a coalition government led by AVP leader Henny Eman. Every government since 1985 has been formed by either the AVP or MEP.

The 2017 general election resulted in the AVP losing four of its thirteen seats, with both the AVP and MEP winning nine seats each. No party had a majority in parliament until the formation of the coalition. Eman subsequently announced that he would resign the leadership of the AVP and that the AVP would become an opposition party. A coalition was formed between AVP and FUTURO after the 2024 election.

The AVP is a christian democratic party.

== Election results ==
=== Netherlands Antilles Island Council elections ===
Election	Leader	Votes	%	Seats	+/–
1951	Henny Eman	4,510	35.32 (#1)	8 / 21	New
1955	Henny Eman	2,533	17.57 (#2)	3 / 21	▼5
1959	Shon A. Eman	4,899	28.31 (#2)	6 / 21	▲3
1963	Shon A. Eman	5,668	29.32 (#2)	6 / 21	0
1967	Shon A. Eman	8,413	36.81 (#2)	8 / 21	▲2
1971	Dominico Croes	3,413	14.49 (#3)	3 / 21	▼3
1975	Rudy Frank	1,743	5.65 (#3)	1 / 21	▼2
1979	Henny Eman	6,063	18.50 (#2)	4 / 21	▲3
1983	Henny Eman	8,102	22.57 (#2)	5 / 21	▲1

=== Aruba general elections ===
Election	Leader	Votes	%	Seats	+/–	Status	Reference
1985	Henny Eman	11,480	31.33 (#2)	7 / 21	▲2	Coalition	
1989	Henny Eman	12,668	35.16 (#2)	8 / 21	▲1	Opposition	
1993	Henny Eman	15,621	39.18 (#1)	9 / 21	▲1	Opposition	
1994	Henny Eman	17,963	45.40 (#1)	10 / 21	▲1	Coalition	
1997	Henny Eman	19,476	43.53 (#1)	10 / 21	0	Coalition	
2001	Robertico Croes	12,749	26.58 (#2)	6 / 21	▼4	Opposition	
2005	Mike Eman	16,725	32.59 (#2)	8 / 21	▲2	Opposition	
2009	Mike Eman	26,485	48.03 (#1)	12 / 21	▲4	Majority	
2013	Mike Eman	33,103	57.28 (#1)	13 / 21	▲1	Majority	
2017	Mike Eman	23,385	39.86 (#1)	9 / 21	▼4	Opposition	
2021	Mike Eman	18,348	31.28 (#2)	7 / 21	▼2	Opposition	
2024	Mike Eman	17,872	32.21 (#1)	9 / 21	▲2	Coalition	

== Works cited ==
=== Books ===
- Hopkins, Jack, ed. (1985). Latin American and Caribbean Contemporary Record. Vol. 3. Holmes and Meier Publishers. ISBN 0841910154.
- Lijphart, Arend (1977). Democracy in Plural Societies: A Comparative Exploration. Yale University Press. ISBN 9780300158182.
- Lansford, Tom, ed. (2017). Political Handbook of The World 2016–2017. CQ Press. ISBN 9781506327174.

=== Journals ===
- Allen, Rose; Heuvel, Jeroen (2021). "From Individual to Collective Memories: The Year in Aruba". Biography. 90 (3). University of Hawaiʻi Press: 9–12. doi:10.2307/27100114. JSTOR 27100114.
- Schields, Chelsea (2016). ""This is the Soul of Aruba Speaking"". New West Indian Guide. 90 (3). Brill Publishers: 195–224.

=== News ===
- "Aruba krijgt coalitie, Eman stapt uit de politiek". Caribisch Netwerk. 23 September 2017. Archived from the original on 8 October 2017.
- "Arubaanse oud-premier Henny Eman overleden: 'Hij heeft zijn leven gewijd aan het dienen van ons eiland'". Caribisch Netwerk. 7 January 2025. Archived from the original on 18 June 2025.
- "AVP wint nek-aan-nekrace op Aruba, nieuwe partij Futuro bepaalt formatie". Nederlandse Omroep Stichting. 7 December 2024. Archived from the original on 18 June 2025.
- Stamper, Melissa (12 February 2025). "Einde van Arubaanse regeringsformatie in zicht: "Eens over een kabinet met zeven ministers"". Caribisch Netwerk. Archived from the original on 18 June 2025.

=== Web ===
- "Aruban Legislature 2009 General". International Foundation for Electoral Systems. Archived from the original on 18 June 2025.
- "Aruban Legislature 2013 General". International Foundation for Electoral Systems. Archived from the original on 18 June 2025.
- "Aruban Legislature 2017 General". International Foundation for Electoral Systems. Archived from the original on 18 June 2025.
- "Aruban Legislature 2021 General". International Foundation for Electoral Systems. Archived from the original on 18 June 2025.
- "Aruban Legislature 2024 General". International Foundation for Electoral Systems. Archived from the original on 18 June 2025.
