= Democratic Network =

Aruban political party

Democratic Network Democratisch Netwerk (Dutch) RED Democratico (Papiamento)
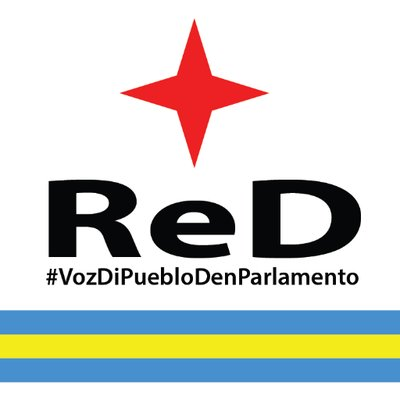
- Abbreviation: RED
- Leader: Ricardo Croes
- Founder: Rudy Lampe
- Founded: 2003
- Ideology: Progressivism; Green politics
- Political position: Center-left
- Regional affiliation: São Paulo Forum

Democratic Network (RED Democratico, RED) is a progressive, green political party in Aruba.

Following the 2017 Aruban general election it had one seat in the Estates of Aruba and was part of the government coalition under Prime Minister Evelyn Wever-Croes.

== History ==
Rudy Lampe founded the party.

During the 2005 Aruban general election, the party obtained 3,330 votes which was sufficient for one out of 21 seats. The party participated in both the 2009 and 2013 elections; however, it failed to win a seat in either election.

For the 2017 Aruban general election, Ricardo Croes was the party list leader. Party founder Lampe was number two on the list. The party obtained 4,166 votes and thus one seat in the Estates of Aruba. The party subsequently became part of the government coalition led by Prime Minister Evelyn Wever-Croes. Lampe joined the cabinet as specialist Minister of Education, Science and Sustainable Development and resigned his party membership to do so.

== Election results ==
=== Aruba general elections ===
Election	Leader	Votes	%	Seats	+/–	Status
2005	Rudy Lampe	3,330	6.49 (#4)	1 / 21	New	Opposition
2009	Rudy Lampe	2,378	4.31 (#5)	0 / 21	▼1	Extra-parliamentary
2013	Rudy Lampe	1,209	2.09 (#4)	0 / 21	0	Extra-parliamentary
2017	Ricardo Croes	4,166	7.10 (#4)	1 / 21	▲1	Coalition
2021	Ricardo Croes	1,784	3.04 (#7)	0 / 21	▼1	Extra-parliamentary
2024	Ricardo Croes	635	1.14 (#9)	0 / 21	0	Extra-parliamentary
