= People's Electoral Movement (Aruba) =

People's Electoral Movement Movimiento Electoral di Pueblo
- Leader: Evelyn Wever-Croes
- Founder: Betico Croes
- Founded: 1971
- Ideology: Social democracy Aruban independence
- Political position: Centre-left
- Regional affiliation: COPPPAL
- Colours: Yellow
- Parliament of Aruba: 8 / 21

Party flag
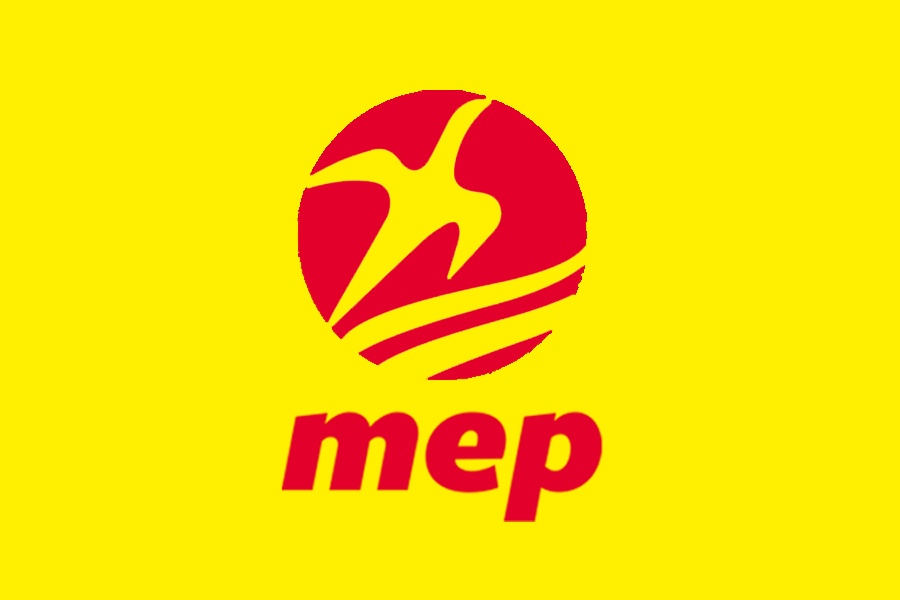

Website
- www.mep.aw

The People's Electoral Movement (Dutch: Electorale Volksbeweging, Papiamento: Movimiento Electoral di Pueblo, MEP) is a social democratic political party in Aruba. Following the 2001 general election for the Parliament of Aruba the party won 52.4% of popular vote and 12 out of 21 seats. In the 2005 general election, the party won 43% of the popular vote and 11 out of 21 seats thus won the election and remained in power. In the 2009 general election, MEP lost 2 seats and won 36% of the vote, subsequently losing the election.

In the 2017 general election, the MEP won 37% of the vote, and gained a seat. Following the appointment of a formateur, the MEP agreed to form a Coalition government with Pueblo Orguyoso y Respeta (POR) and Network of Electoral Democracy (RED).

Following the 2021 Aruban general election, the MEP remained the largest party in parliament and went on subsequently to form a minority government. After the 2021 Aruban general election, the MEP was relegated to second place and to opposition.

== Notable members ==
- Betico Croes, political activist who played a major role in Aruba's separation of the Netherlands Antilles
- Nelson Oduber, 2nd Prime Minister of Aruba
- Frans Figaroa, former Lieutenant Governor and Speaker of the Parliament of the Netherlands Antilles
- Evelyn Wever-Croes, 4th Prime Minister of Aruba

== Election results ==
=== Netherlands Antilles Island Council elections ===
Election	Leader	Votes	%	Seats	+/–
1971	Betico Croes	8,095	34.37 (#2)	7 / 21	New
1975	Betico Croes	18,374	59.54 (#1)	13 / 21	▲6
1979	Betico Croes	18,551	56.60 (#1)	12 / 21	▼1
1983	Betico Croes	20,798	57.94 (#1)	13 / 21	▲1

=== Aruba general elections ===
Election	Leader	Votes	%	Seats	+/–	Status
1985	Betico Croes	13,786	37.62 (#1)	8 / 21	▼5	Opposition
1989	Nelson Oduber	16,555	45.95 (#1)	10 / 21	▲2	Coalition
1993	Nelson Oduber	14,907	37.39 (#2)	9 / 21	▼1	Coalition
1994	Nelson Oduber	15,437	39.02 (#2)	9 / 21	0	Opposition
1997	Nelson Oduber	17,358	38.80 (#2)	9 / 21	0	Opposition
2001	Nelson Oduber	25,172	52.48 (#1)	12 / 21	▲3	Majority
2005	Nelson Oduber	22,002	42.87 (#1)	11 / 21	▼1	Majority
2009	Nelson Oduber	19,804	35.93 (#2)	8 / 21	▼3	Opposition
2013	Evelyn Wever-Croes	17,653	30.54 (#2)	7 / 21	▼1	Opposition
2017	Evelyn Wever-Croes	22,061	37.61 (#2)	9 / 21	▲2	Coalition
2021	Evelyn Wever-Croes	20,700	35.32 (#1)	9 / 21	0	Coalition
2024	Evelyn Wever-Croes	17,571	31.66 (#2)	8 / 21	▼1	Opposition
