= Mike Eman =

Aruban politician

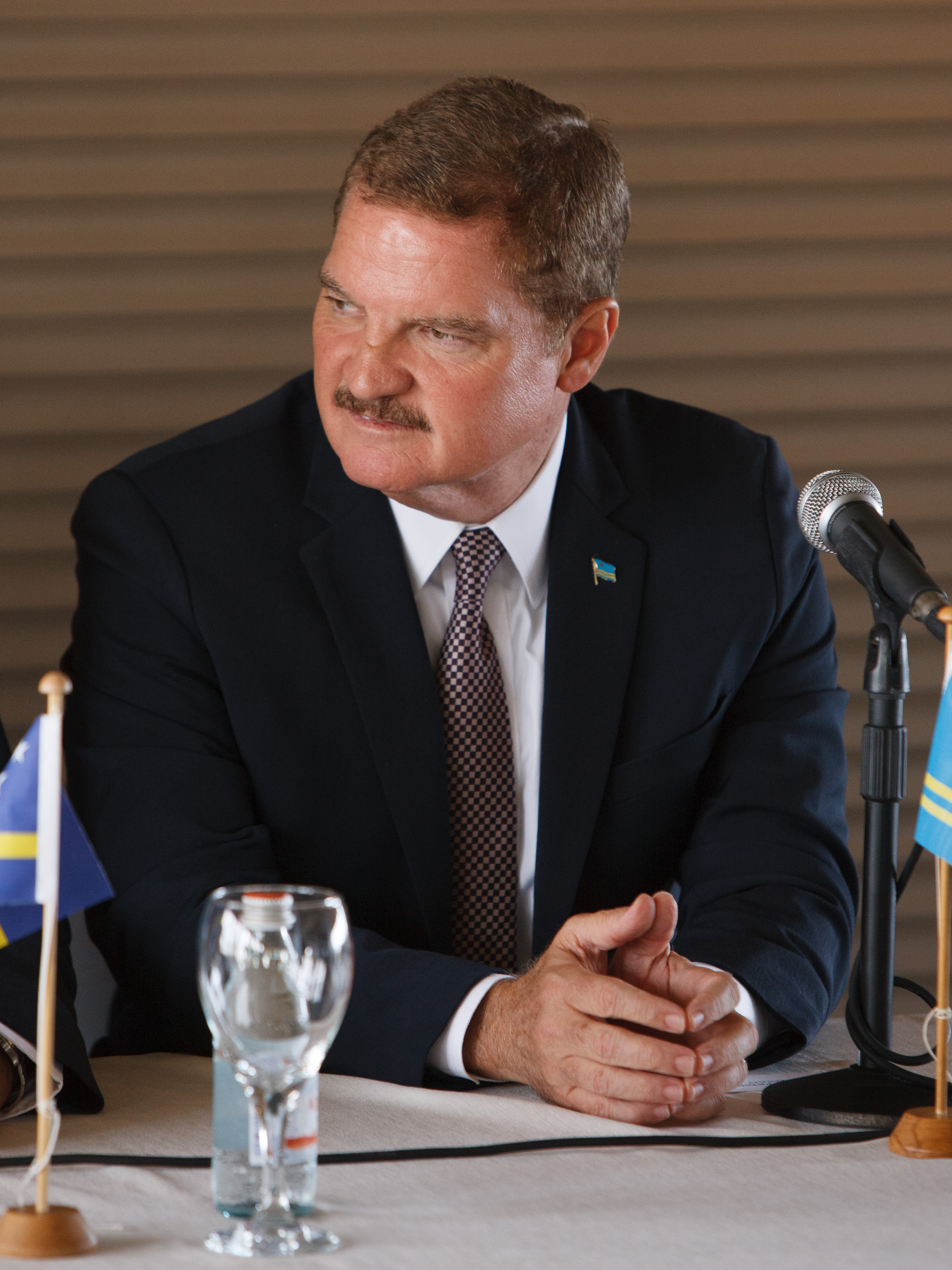
- Eman in 2015

3rd & 5th Prime Minister of Aruba
- Incumbent
- Assumed office 28 March 2025
- Monarch: Willem-Alexander
- Governor-General: Alfonso Boekhoudt
- Preceded by: Evelyn Wever-Croes
- In office 30 October 2009 – 17 November 2017
- Monarchs: Beatrix; Willem-Alexander
- Governor: Fredis Refunjol; Alfonso Boekhoudt
- Preceded by: Nelson Oduber
- Succeeded by: Evelyn Wever-Croes

Personal details
- Born: Michiel Godfried Eman; 1 September 1961 (age 64) Oranjestad, Aruba, Netherlands Antilles
- Party: Aruban People's Party
- Spouse: Doina Neagoy

Michiel Godfried "Mike" Eman (born 1 September 1961) is an Aruban politician currently serving as the 5th Prime Minister of Aruba since 2025. He previously served as the 3rd Prime Minister from 2009 to 2017.

== Early life and education ==
Eman was born in Oranjestad to Albert (Shon A) Eman, at the time leader of the Aruban People's Party, and his wife Blanche Eman-Harthogh. He is the youngest of eight children, including his late brother Henny Eman. His grandfather, father and brother were all prominent politicians in their lifetimes, with Henny being the first to hold the office after Aruba's status aparte in 1986.

Eman is a graduate of the University of the Netherlands Antilles (UNA, now known as the University of Curaçao) earning his law degree in 1992 with the thesis The Position of the Institution of the Public Prosecutor vis à vis the Minister of Justice in a Small Scale Community. In 1996 he earned a degree in vivil notary law from the same university.

From 1992 to 2001, Eman worked as a deputy civil law notary and co-founded several private commercial ventures and foundations for political studies.

== Political career ==
Eman was involved in politics in one way or another since his childhood. He began his formal political career in September 2001, when he appeared 3rd on the list of the AVP. The 2001 elections did not go in favor of the AVP causing the party to lose 4 seats in the parliament. This led to the decision of the AVP leader, Tico Croes, to relinquish position. The leadership was handed over to the former minister of Justice, Pedro E. (Eddy) Croes. Eman became the party's VP and the minority whip leader in parliament. He was subsequently elected party leader in 2003.

After the 2009 elections, the AVP regained 2 seats, and Eman's part became thus the majority party in parliament. Eman's first cabinet was sworn in on October 30, 2009. Following his party's decisive victory in the 2013 election, his second cabinet was sworn in on 30 October 2013.

In 2017, he said at the contract signing of the Sunrise Solar Park, "Aruba has proven the world that, although we are limited in size, we can have big dreams and important goals. Maybe we inherited an arid soil, but we are blessed with an abundance of sun and wind to turn that into energy and well being for our society. We have translated those gifts into a vision to make our island totally sustainable by 2020."

Following the 2017 general election, Eman's party lost its majority in the Parliament of Aruba. Eman subsequently announced that he would resign as party leader and that he would not take a seat in the upcoming parliament.

Following the 2024 general election, Eman formed a coalition between his party; AVP, and FUTURO.

== Personal life ==
Eman is Jewish and plays an active role in the Jewish community and has worked to promote the presence of Chabad in Aruba. His mother was a Sephardic Jew from Suriname and his father was Protestant.
