= Aruban Patriotic Party =

Aruban political party

Aruban Patriotic Party Partido Patriotico di Aruba
- Leader: Otmar Oduber
- Founded: 1949
- Ideology: Social democracy Social liberalism
- Political position: Centre-left

The Aruban Patriotic Party (Papiamento: Partido Patriotico di Aruba, PPA; Dutch: Arubaanse Patriottische Partij) is a political party in Aruba. It was founded in 1949.

Prior to Aruba's status aparte, it was a supporter of a unified, independent Netherlands Antilles.

In the 2001 Aruban general election, the party won 9.6% of the popular vote and two out of the 21 seats. In the 2005 Aruban general election, it won 2.1% of the vote and no seats. Its share of the vote fell to 1.1% in 2009 and 0.9% in 2013. In the 2017 Aruban general election, it rose to 1.1% of the vote while running in conjunction with the Patriotic Progressive Union. Running alone in 2021, it garnered 3.1% of the vote.
