= Parliament of Aruba =

National legislature of Aruba

Parliament of Aruba Parlamento di Aruba
- 14th Aruban Estates

Type
- Type: Unicameral

History
- Founded: 1 January 1986

Leadership
- Monarch: King Willem-Alexander
- Prime Minister: Mike Eman, AVP since 28 March 2025
- Speaker: Marlon Sneek, AVP since 27 March 2025

Structure
- Seats: 21
- Parliament political groups: Government (12): AVP (9); FUTURO (3); Opposition (9): MEP (8); PPA (1)

Elections
- Parliament voting system: Open list proportional representation (D'Hondt method)
- Last Parliament election: 6 December 2024

Meeting place
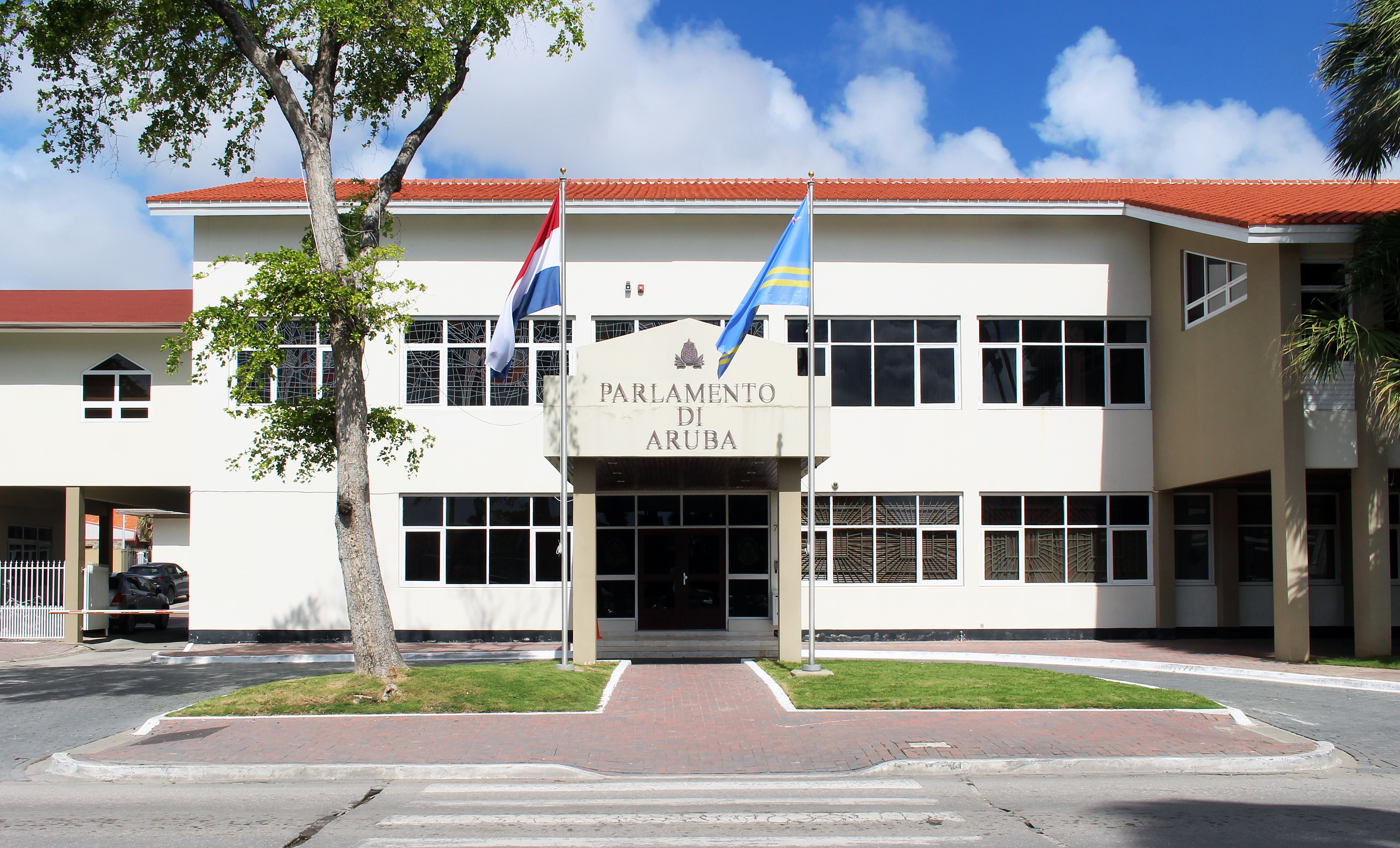
- Parliament building in Oranjestad

Website
- www.parlamento.aw

The Parliament of Aruba (Papiamento: Parlamento di Aruba, Dutch: Staten van Aruba) is the unicameral legislature or parliament of Aruba. The parliament has 21 members, elected for a four-year term by proportional representation. Each member holds their seats until the parliament is dissolved, which is every four years by a general election. The leader of the party which gains a majority of seats usually becomes the prime minister.

== Elections ==
=== 2024 ===
The most recent elections were held on 6 December 2024.

Party	Votes	%	Seats	+/–
Aruban People's Party	17,877	32.21	9	+2
People's Electoral Movement	17,571	31.66	8	–1
FUTURO	7,349	13.24	3	New
Aruban Patriotic Party	3,538	6.38	1	+1
RAIZ	2,323	4.19	0	–2
Accion 21	2,204	3.97	0	–1
Aruban Sovereignty Movement	1,722	3.10	0	–2
Fight for Reform	1,349	2.43	0	New
Democratic Network	635	1.14	0	0
Youth Bringing Change	505	0.91	0	0
United Christians Strengthening Aruba's Potential	423	0.76	0	0
Total	55,496	100.00	21	0
Valid votes	55,496	98.27		
Invalid/blank votes	976	1.73		
Total votes	56,472	100.00		
Registered voters/turnout	69,824	80.88		
Source: Electoral Council

== Parliament building ==
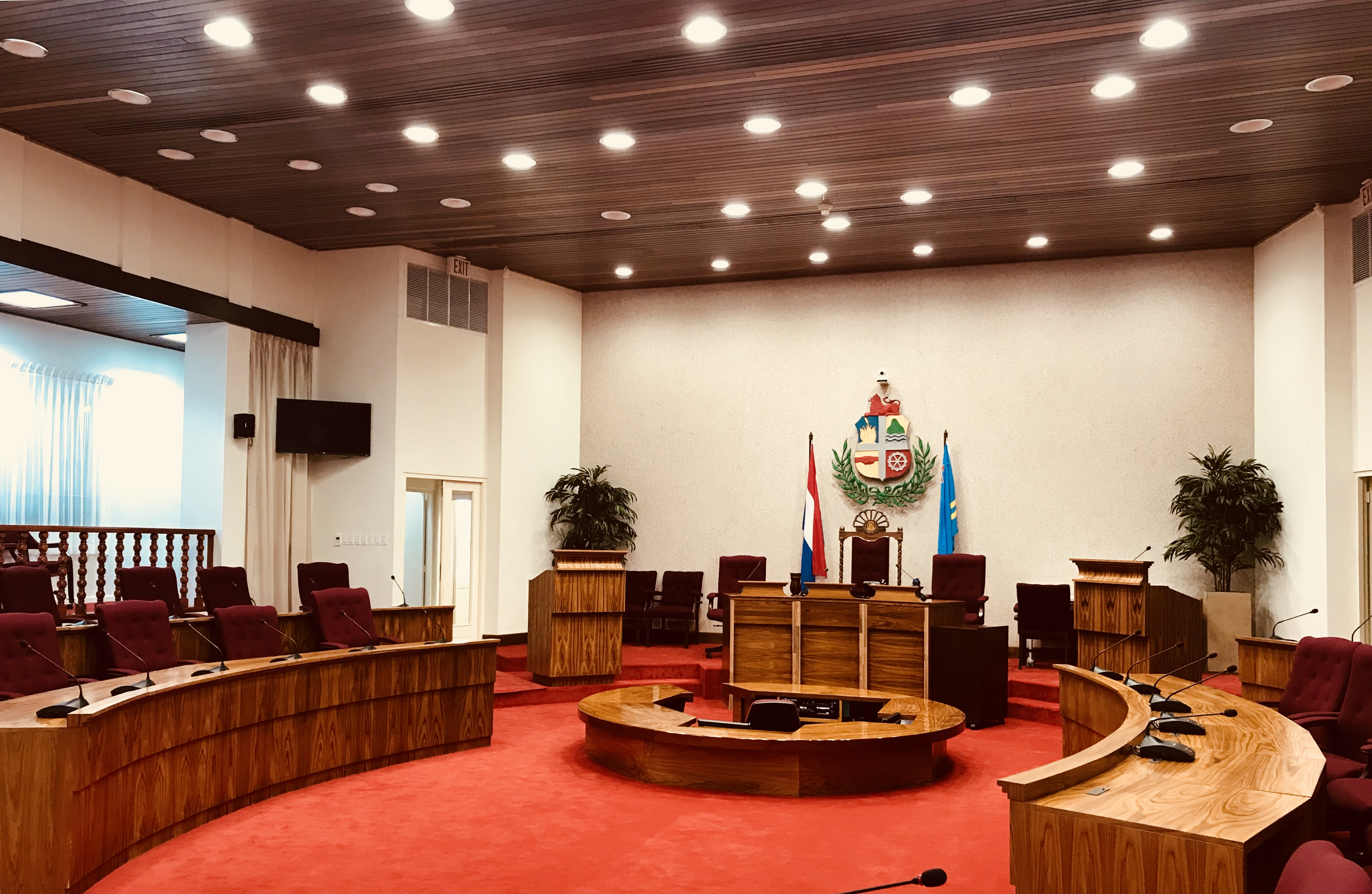
Inside the Parliament of Aruba

In 1975, the parliament building was opened for the Island Council of Aruba. The council did not have its own building, and had been renting locations in Oranjestad for almost 25 years. The building was officially called "Edificio di parlemento di Aruba".

On 1 January 1986, the Status aparte was granted to Aruba making it a constituent country within the Kingdom of the Netherlands. The Parliament of Aruba became the successor of the Island Council.

In 2011, construction started on a large extension of the parliament building.

== See also ==
- List of presidents of the Estates of Aruba
