= List of Arubans =

Arubans are people who are identified with Aruba through residential, legal, historical, or cultural means.

- Dave Benton, Aruban-Estonian musician.
- Alfonso Boekhoudt, 4th Governor of Aruba.
- Xander Bogaerts, shortstop in MLB.
- Carol Bruyning, former beauty queen.
- Betico Croes, political activist.
- Denzel Dumfries, footballer for the Netherlands national team and Real Madrid CF.
- Boy Ecury, Aruban-Dutch resistance member in World War II.
- Nydia Ecury, writer.
- Henny Eman, first prime minister of Aruba.
- Mike Eman, 3rd prime minister of Aruba.
- Bobby Farrell, musician, former and male member of Boney M.
- Hildward Croes, musician and composer.
- Frans Figaroa, Lieutenant Governor of Aruba 1979–1982.
- Henry Habibe, poet.
- Andrew Holleran, novelist.
- Maria Irausquin-Wajcberg, first elected female politician in Aruba.
- Fred Jüssi, Estonian biologist and nature writer.
- Olindo Koolman, 2nd governor of Aruba.
- Juan Lampe, musician.
- Macuarima, first Aruban Amerindian Chief killed by colonist.
- Calvin Maduro, pitcher in MLB.
- Hedwiges Maduro, former footballer and now a coach.
- Jossy Mansur, editor of the Papiamento language newspaper, Diario.
- Diederick Charles Mathew, politician.
- John Merryweather (1932–2019), first minister plenipotentiary of Aruba.
- Nelson Oduber, 2nd prime minister of Aruba.
- Sarah-Quita Offringa, world champion windsurfer.
- Olga Orman, writer and poet
- Sidney Ponson, pitcher in MLB.
- Fredis Refunjol, 3rd governor of Aruba.
- Julia Renfro, newspaper editor and photographer.
- Jeannette Richardson-Baars,director of the Police Academy of Aruba.
- Xiomara Ruiz-Maduro, minister for finance, economic affairs & culture.
- Chadwick Tromp, catcher in MLB.
- Felipe Tromp, first governor of Aruba.
- Laura Wernet-Paskel, first female political candidate in Aruba.
- Evelyn Wever-Croes, 4th prime minister of Aruba, first female prime minister.
- Damian Pinas, first Aruban mixed martial artist competing in the UFC.

== See also ==
- Index of Aruba-related articles
- Outline of Aruba
- Arubans in the Netherlands
- Aruban-Americans
