= Rudy Croes =

Aruban politician (1946–2021)

President of the Parliament of Aruba
- In office October 2005 – November 2005
- Preceded by: Marlon Werleman
- Succeeded by: Mervin Wyatt-Ras

Member of the Parliament of Aruba
- In office 1989–2001

Minister of Justice
- In office 30 October 2001 – 29 October 2009
- Preceded by: Eddy Croes
- Succeeded by: Arthur Dowers

Personal details
- Born: Hyacintho Rudolfo Croes; 5 September 1946 Aruba
- Died: 20 November 2021 (aged 75) Oranjestad, Aruba
- Party: MEP

Rudy Croes (5 September 1946 – 20 November 2021) was an Aruban politician. A member of the People's Electoral Movement, he briefly served as President of the Parliament of Aruba in 2005 after having been a member of the Parliament of Aruba from 1989 to 1993 and 1994 to 2001. He was also Minister of Justice from 1993 to 1994 and 2001 to 2009.

== Early life ==
Croes was born on 5 September 1946 in Aruba. He was one of twelve children of Francisco Cornelio Panchico Croes and Maria Louisa Mimita Croes-Lopez. His brother, Betico Croes, was a prominent advocate for status aparte. From 1973 to 1974, he worked as the head of laboratory and production at LETI Laboratories in Caracas.

== Political career ==
In 1989, he ran for a seat on the MEP list as candidate number 5. He received 4,707 personal votes in the 1989 Aruban general election, which surpassed that of party leader Nelson Oduber. He became popular due to his firm position against the Netherlands, and thus was a faithful believer in status aparte. He stated that Aruba was too dependent on the Netherlands, and stated the Dutch should be banned from legislation and jurisprudence, and that the Dutch language should be replaced with Papiamento. However, it was stated that he did not directly hate the Dutch, just Dutch politicians who interfered too much in the affairs of Aruba. Soon after, he decided to run independently, which he did for the next two elections, due to his not being included as a candidate in elections due to the MEP party leadership. In 1995, he announced that he would lead the new party, Rudy Croes Lider, with him announcing that he had been heavily supported in the 1989 elections, which meant that the will of the people chose him.

In 1993, he became Minister of Justice in Nelson Oduber's second cabinet. He again became Minister of Justice between 2001 and 2009. He became controversial in 2007 for stating that Aruba should sever all ties with the Netherlands, which he later retracted. During his second term as minister, the Disappearance of Natalee Holloway also occurred, which brought international attention. Upon her disappearance, Croes gave over investigative powers to the Netherlands and appealed for support from the Dutch police.
