= Croes =

Croes is a Dutch-language surname. It is one of the most common surnames in Aruba. People with this name include:

- Betico Croes (1938–1986), Aruban politician
- Evelyn Wever-Croes (1966), Aruban politician, first female prime minister of Aruba
- Francois Croes (born 1990), Aruban football player
- Frido Croes (1957–2020), Aruban politician
- Hildward Croes (1962–2014), Aruban musician
- Mito Croes (1946–2016), Aruban politician
- Paul Croes (born 1976), Aruban politician
- Emiliano Croes (born 1966 Aruba), Dutch folkloric musician

== See also ==
- Kroes
