= Angel Bermudez =

Aruban politician (born 1950 or 1951)

Minister of Finance
- In office 28 July 2014 – 17 November 2017
- Prime Minister: Mike Eman
- Preceded by: Juan David Yrausquin
- Succeeded by: Xiomara Ruiz-Maduro

Minister of Transport and Communication
- In office 1987–1989
- Prime Minister: Henny Eman
- Preceded by: Benny Nisbet

Personal details
- Born: 1950 or 1951 Aruba

Angel Roald Bermudez (born 1950 or 1951) is an Aruban politician. He served as Minister of Transport and Communication between 1987 and 1989. From 2011 to 2014, he was director of the Tax and Customs Administration of the Caribbean Netherlands. Bermudez served as Minister of Finance between 28 July 2014 and 17 November 2017.

== Career ==
Bermudez was born on Aruba and raised in the Netherlands. He studied fiscal and company law at the Erasmus University Rotterdam. He subsequently obtained a postdoctoral title at Leiden University. After training as a tax inspector Bermudez returned to Aruba where he became head of the tax inspection.

After Aruba gained its status as an autonomous country within the Kingdom of the Netherlands in 1986, Bermudez served in the first cabinet of Henny Eman. He was minister of Transport and Communication from February 1987 and March 1989, replacing Benny Nisbet. Bermudez subsequently worked as fiscalist in the private sector.

From 1 January 2011 to 1 July 2014, Bermudez was director of the Tax and Customs Administration of the Caribbean Netherlands. He subsequently served shortly as chef de bureau of Aruban Minister of Finance Juan David Yrausquin. When Yrausquin resigned as Minister Bermudez succeeded him, taking office on 28 July 2014. His term in office ended when the government of Evelyn Wever-Croes was sworn in on 17 November 2017, he was succeeded by Xiomara Ruiz-Maduro.

In 2016, Bermudez was the candidate of the Aruban government for the function of Governor of Aruba. After a conflict with the Dutch government Alfonso Boekhoudt obtained the position.

Bermudez is married and has two children.
