= Prime Minister of Aruba =

Head of the government of Aruba

- Minister-President van Aruba (Dutch); Prome minister di Aruba (Papiamento)
- Flag of Aruba

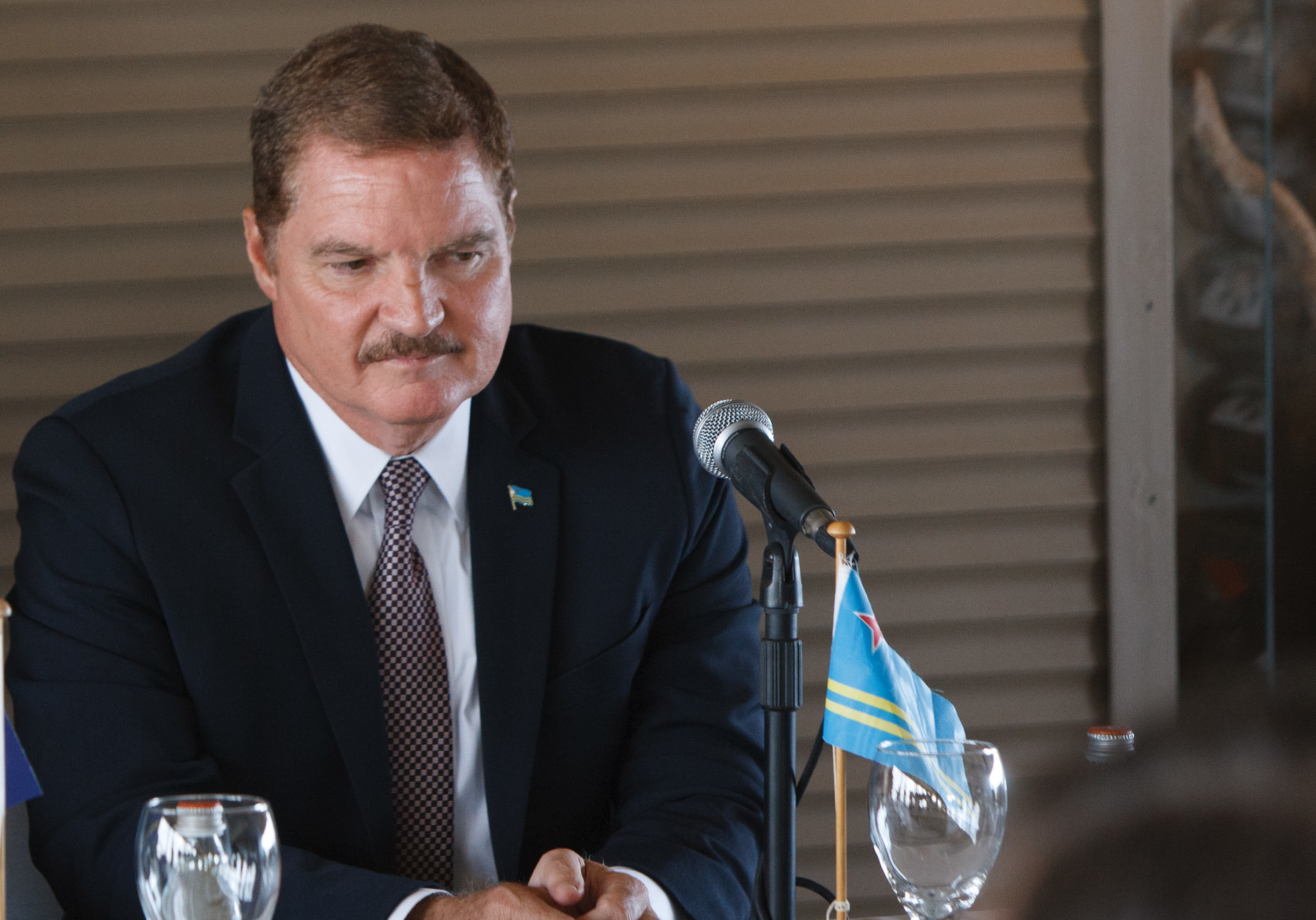
- Incumbent; Mike Eman since 28 March 2025
- Type: Head of government
- Appointer: Governor of Aruba
- Precursor: Prime Minister of the Netherlands Antilles
- Formation: 1 January 1986; 40 years ago
- First holder: Henny Eman

The prime minister of Aruba (Papiamento: Prome minister di Aruba; Dutch: Minister-President van Aruba) is de facto head of the executive branch of government. Together with Aruba's Council of Ministers, they form the executive branch of Aruban government.

== List of prime ministers ==
No.	Portrait	Name (Birth–Death)	Term of office			Political party	Election	Government	Governor (term)	Monarch(s) (reign)	Ref.
No.	Portrait	Name (Birth–Death)	Took office	Left office	Time in office	Political party	Election	Government	Governor (term)	Monarch(s) (reign)	Ref.
1		Henny Eman (1948–2025)	1 January 1986	9 February 1989	3 years, 39 days	AVP	1985	H. Eman I	Felipe Tromp (1986–1992)	Beatrix r. 1980–2013	
2		Nelson Oduber (born 1947)	9 February 1989	1 September 1994	5 years, 204 days	MEP	1989	Oduber I	Felipe Tromp (1986–1992)	Beatrix r. 1980–2013	
2		Nelson Oduber (born 1947)	9 February 1989	1 September 1994	5 years, 204 days	MEP	1993	Oduber II	Olindo Koolman (1992–2004)	Beatrix r. 1980–2013	
(1)		Henny Eman (1948–2025)	1 September 1994	30 October 2001	7 years, 59 days	AVP	1994	H. Eman II	Olindo Koolman (1992–2004)	Beatrix r. 1980–2013	
(1)		Henny Eman (1948–2025)	1 September 1994	30 October 2001	7 years, 59 days	AVP	1997	H. Eman III	Olindo Koolman (1992–2004)	Beatrix r. 1980–2013	
(2)		Nelson Oduber (born 1947)	30 October 2001	30 October 2009	8 years, 0 days	MEP	2001	Oduber III	Olindo Koolman (1992–2004)	Beatrix r. 1980–2013	
(2)		Nelson Oduber (born 1947)	30 October 2001	30 October 2009	8 years, 0 days	MEP	2005	Oduber IV	Fredis Refunjol (2004–2016)	Beatrix r. 1980–2013	
3		Mike Eman (born 1961)	30 October 2009	17 November 2017	8 years, 18 days	AVP	2009	M. Eman I	Fredis Refunjol (2004–2016)	Beatrix r. 1980–2013	
3		Mike Eman (born 1961)	30 October 2009	17 November 2017	8 years, 18 days	AVP	2013	M. Eman II	Fredis Refunjol (2004–2016)	Willem-Alexander r. 2013–present	
4		Evelyn Wever-Croes (born 1967)	17 November 2017	28 March 2025	7 years, 131 days	MEP	2017	Wever-Croes I	Alfonso Boekhoudt (2017–present)	Willem-Alexander r. 2013–present	
4		Evelyn Wever-Croes (born 1967)	17 November 2017	28 March 2025	7 years, 131 days	MEP	2021	Wever-Croes II	Alfonso Boekhoudt (2017–present)	Willem-Alexander r. 2013–present	
(3)		Mike Eman (born 1961)	28 March 2025	Incumbent	1 year, 226 days	AVP	2024	M. Eman III	Alfonso Boekhoudt (2017–present)	Willem-Alexander r. 2013–present	
