= 1977 Aruba general strike =

General strike in Aruba for independence from the Netherlands Antilles

The 1977 Aruba general strike (Papiamento: Augustus Scur, 'Dark August') was a major week-long general strike on Aruba from August 11 to 18, 1977. The strike was organized by Aruban politician and activist Betico Croes and the MEP party (People's Electoral Movement) in pursuit of autonomy for Aruba and secession from the Netherlands Antilles, which was largely dominated by Curaçao, who opposed Aruba's secession.

The 1977 general strike on Aruba is considered a major breakthrough in Aruba's political struggle for autonomy and secession from the Netherlands Antilles, which was ultimately achieved in 1986 with Aruba's Status Aparte.

== Events ==
=== Causes and origins ===
The general strike organized by Betico Croes and the MEP in 1977 had numerous causes and origins.

The background of the strike was Aruba's movement for autonomy and independence from Curaçao and later the Netherlands Antilles, which began with Henny Eman (born 1887) in the 1930s, but was continuously opposed by the central governments in Curaçao and the Netherlands.

The strike was in response to Boy Rozendal and the Democratic Party of Curaçao, long-standing opponents of Aruban autonomy, skipping the information phase of the formation of a new cabinet and installing their coalition to lead the Netherlands Antillean government after winning the 1977 Netherlands Antilles election, in an effort to exclude the Aruban MEP party from the new government, MEP being the pro-Aruban independence party who became the majority party in Aruba after winning the island council election of the same year.

The strike was also in response to the Netherlands Antillean government declaring the 1977 Aruban independence referendum as illegal, which showed the vast majority of Aruba's population being in favor of secession from the Netherlands Antilles and was supported by the United Nations. The arrest of two Aruban union members by Netherlands Antillean police on August 10 also added further fuel to the strike. The strike was shortly preceded by a boycott of Curaçaoan products also.

=== The strike ===
On August 11, the general strike completely shut down Aruba. Netherlands Antillean riot police sent from Curaçao maintained presence in Aruba, barricading themselves around the police office. Bottles and rocks were thrown by the crowds, the police reacted with tear gas and fired a few warning shots; a Betico Croes supporter was hit in the leg and a bullet also hit Betico Croes' jeep. The riot police made several baton charges. On August 12, the riot police conducted a few raids, including the search of Betico Croes' parental home in Santa Cruz.

On August 18, the strike ended when the union members who had been arrested by Netherlands Antillean police on August 10, were set free again. On the same day, a message came in from the Hague that Prime Minister Den Uyl was willing to meet with an Aruban delegation to listen to their wishes.

=== Aftermath ===
The 1977 Aruban general strike paved way for political dialogue between Aruba, the Netherlands and Netherlands Antilles regarding Aruba's status within the kingdom. Later leading to Aruba's political secession from the Netherlands Antilles and becoming a separate, self governing, constituent country within the Kingdom of the Netherlands in 1986 with the conditions of full independence by 1996. The transition to full independence by 1996 was halted by Aruba's request in an agreement with the Netherlands in 1990, with Aruba retaining its autonomous status within the Dutch kingdom.

== See also ==
- Aruba
- Betico Croes
- Netherlands Antilles
- Kingdom of the Netherlands
