= Frido Croes =

Aruban politician (1957–2020)

Minister Plenipotentiary of Aruba
- In office 8 November 2005 – 31 October 2009
- Preceded by: Ella Tromp-Yarzagaray
- Succeeded by: Edwin Abath

Minister of Education and Administrative Affairs
- In office 2004 – November 2005
- Preceded by: Fredis Refunjol

President of the Estates of Aruba
- In office October 2001 – May 2004
- Preceded by: Eddie Croes
- Succeeded by: Marlon Werleman

Member of the Estates of Aruba
- In office 1989–1994

Personal details
- Born: Francisco Walfrido Croes; 3 December 1957 Aruba
- Died: 9 October 2020 (aged 62)
- Party: People's Electoral Movement

Francisco Walfrido "Frido" Croes (3 December 1957 – 9 October 2020) was an Aruban politician and schoolteacher who held the office of Minister Plenipotentiary of Aruba from 2005 to 2009. Prior to that, he served as a member of the Estates of Aruba from 1989 to 1994, and as its President from 2001 to 2004. He also served as Minister of Education from 2004 to 2005.

== Biography ==
Croes was born on 3 December 1957 in Aruba, one of the Caribbean islands of the Lesser Antilles and a country of the Kingdom of the Netherlands.

Having obtained his havo diploma (secondary school leavers’ certificate), Croes began studying to become a teacher at the Aruban Pedagogical Academy. After graduating, he worked as a teacher for a decade at the Colegio San Jose of Santa Cruz. During the last four years of this time, he also held the position of head teacher. Between 1994 and 2001, he was employed as the Public Liaison Official of Education by the Department of Education.

In 1988, Croes became a member of the People's Electoral Movement Movimiento Electoral di Pueblo (MEP), a major Aruban political party. From 1989 until 1994, he held a seat for the MEP in the Estates of Aruba, the Aruban legislature. In the period of 1993–94, he was also the Vice-President of the Estates. In October 2001, he was elected the President of the Estates. He served in this position until May 2004. In 2004, Croes was asked to assume the portfolio of Education and Administrative Affairs from Fredis Refunjol, after the latter’s appointment to the position of Governor of Aruba. He served in this position until November 2005. In the formation of the fourth Oduber Government’s cabinet on 8 November 2005, Frido Croes was named the Minister Plenipotentiary of Aruba in the Netherlands, and served in that position until 31 October 2009.

Croes died on 9 October 2020 at the age of 62.
