= Aruba Police Force =

- Motto: Vigilat ut Quiescant; He guards, for them to rest

Agency overview
- Formed: 1986
- Employees: 650
- Annual budget: $7.9 million (2014)

Jurisdictional structure
- Operations jurisdiction: Aruba
- Area: 178.91 km² (69.08 sq mi)
- Population: 107,436 (2021)
- Governing body: Ministry of Justice & Social Affairs

Operational structure
- Headquarters: Macuarima #65; Santa Cruz, Aruba
- Departments: 3: - Patrolling; - Investigations; - Special Forces

Facilities
- Precincts: 4: District 1: Oranjestad; District 2: Noord; District 3: San Nicolaas; District 4: Santa Cruz

Website
- https://www.kpa.aw

The Aruba Police Force (Dutch: Korps Politie Aruba or KPA, Papiamento: Cuerpo Policial Aruba) is the main law enforcement branch of Aruba. The force operates under the authority of the Minister of Justice. the force is headed by the Chief Commissioner, which is currently Ramon Arnhem.

== History ==
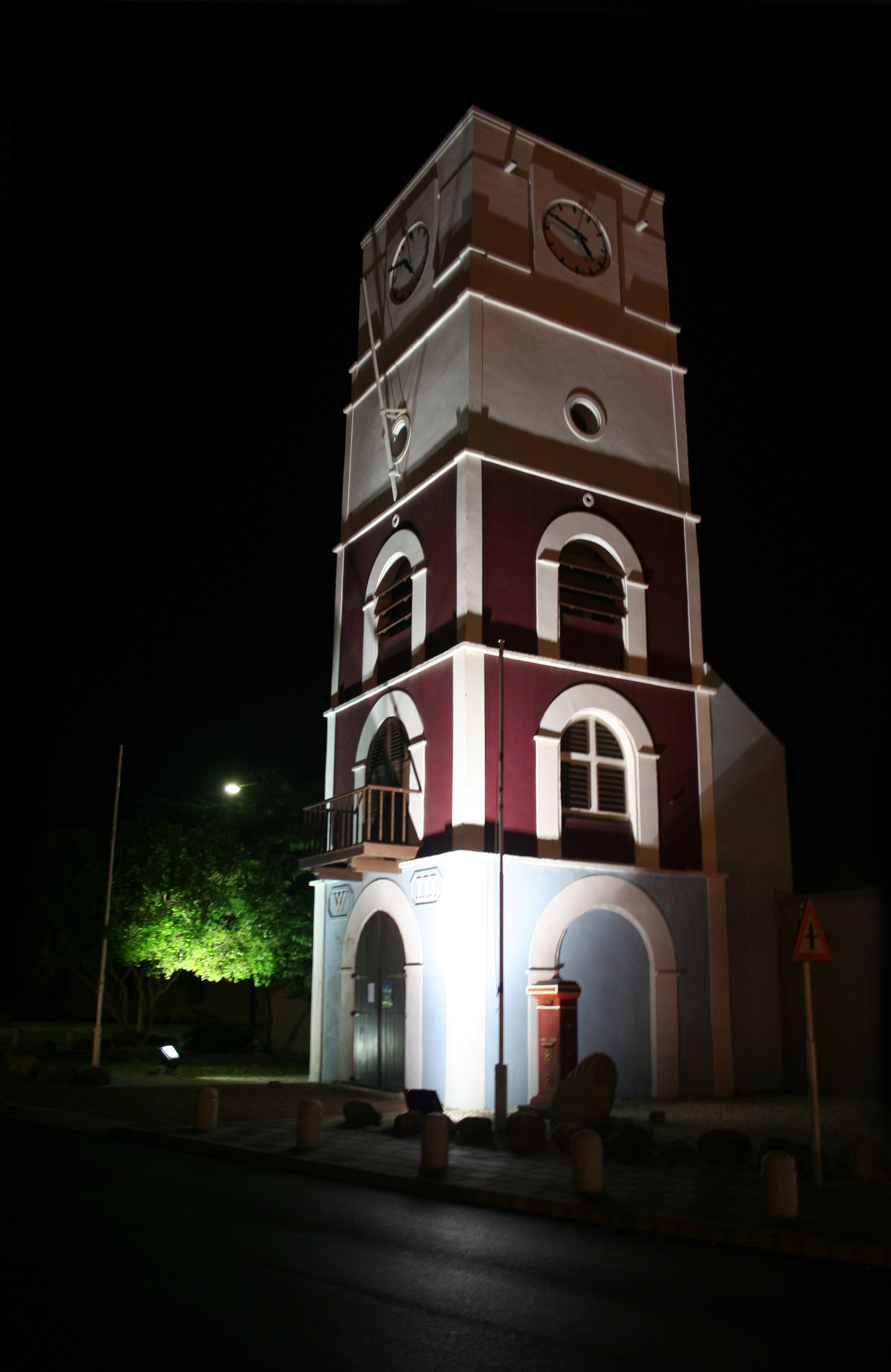
Fort Zoutman.

In 1923, the Police Corps consisted of 8 officers and was understaffed. The first police station was an Aruban house located at the corner of Kazernestraat and Theaterstraat in San Nicolaas. It was used as a precinct until 1939. After being taken over by the Public Works Service, it was torn down in 1950. The Oranjestad precinct were housed in the landmark Fort Zoutman and moved to larger facilities by 1967. The fire brigade was placed under the authority of the police from 1954 until 1977, when the forces were separated by the Minister of Justice. Motorcycle officers were added in the early 1970s.

== Organization ==
The force operates under the authority of the Ministry of Justice and Social Affairs. Day-to-day operations is in the hands of the Chief Commissioner together with other police commissioners and Commissariat staff forming a Management Team.

== Divisions ==
The Police Force consists out of three divisions each headed by a Commissioner of Police

- General Police Operations (Patrol, Law Enforcement, Tourism Police)
- Criminal Investigation Operations (Detective, Forensics and Investigations)
- Special Forces (K9, SWAT, Border Patrol, Riot Control, Bike Patrol)

== Precincts ==
The Police Force has four precincts in all districts, with its HQ located in Macuarima. the Police Force also maintains a few community-tourism based post for better policing. Each precincts is headed by a sergeant who reports directly to the commissioner of general operations. in 2022 it was announced the current HQ in Macuarima will be centralized and moved to Camacuri. as a broader plan to bring all department of justice under the ministry of justice under a headquarters.

== Management ==
List of Chief Commissioners of Police
No.	Chief Commissioner	Took office	Left office	notes
1	Roland W. Peterson	1986	1989	
2	Lucas E. Rasmijn	1990	1996	
3	Alwjn R. Nectar	1997	2003	
4	Roland F. Bernadina	2003	2006	
5.	Peter D. Witte	2006	2010	
6	Adolfo R. Richarson	2010	2018	
7	Andrew Hoo	2018	2020	
8	Vanessa Tjon-Kock	2020	2021	
9	Ramon Arnhem	2022	incumbent	

=== List of commissioners of police ===
No.	Commissioner	Took office	Left office
1	Trudy Hassell	2003	2025
2	Irma Gordon	2013	
3	Robert Candelaria	2023	2025

=== Cooperating with other services ===
When providing aid the police cooperates with other services. When dealing with an accident for example, the police cooperates with ambulance services, doctors and the fire department. The police also has a strong cooperation with the Koninklijke Marechaussee stationed on the island, when it comes to human and drug trafficking.

==== Slachtofferhulp ====
For providing support to victims the police cooperates with Slachtofferhulp (comparable to Victim Support). The employees of Slachtofferhulp are specially trained to provide support to victims of accidents and crime. They make sure that victims are coached, but they also help with filling in forms for insurance or a lawyer.

== Notable cases ==
=== Susan McCormick case ===
On February 10, 1996, the KPA faced the first recorded random homicide of a tourist on Aruba. 47-year-old Susan McCormick was an American bartender from Hampton Bays, New York who was found dead at a roadside near the Steamboat restaurant with a bullet in her neck and her wallet still on her person. Officials from the hotel where McCormick had been staying had reportedly told her family that she had died in a car accident. The police were initially puzzled and refused to publicly discuss the case, but told McCormick's sister Sharon Hoyt that there was no sign of a robbery. On February 16, three local youths aged 15, 18, and 19 were arrested after two informants came forward. One of the teens who intended to rob her waved a .38-caliber pistol, which accidentally fired, and fled the scene by car. McCormick's brother-in-law Jim Sofranko, who visited the site of the shooting in search of clues, stated, "I don't think they expected the gun to go off. She was just in the wrong place at the wrong time." Sofranko said the police told him of another case years ago in which a honeymooning groom killed his bride for the insurance money and that "this was the biggest case they ever had."

=== Mansur family arrests ===
In October 1997, the Aruba Police Force arrested four men, including Eric and Alex Mansur of the powerful Mansur family, for extradition to the United States. They were among 85 individuals indicted in the U.S. District Court of Puerto Rico on federal charges of involvement in a Caribbean money laundering ring following an FBI sting called Operation Golden Trash.

=== Natalee Holloway disappearance ===
Natalee Ann Holloway (October 21, 1986 – disappeared May 30, 2005; declared dead January 12, 2012) was an 18-year-old American teenager whose mysterious disappearance made international news after she vanished on May 30, 2005, in Aruba. Holloway lived in Mountain Brook, Alabama, and graduated from Mountain Brook High School on May 24, 2005, days before the trip. Her disappearance resulted in a media sensation in the United States. Her remains have not been found. Joran Van der sloot and two other individuals, Deepak Kalpoe and his brother Satish Kalpoe, were thought to have been involved in her disappearance. There were rumors that a botched police investigation significantly reduced the chances of finding what happened to Natalee and from getting information from the 3 men last seen with her.

== Ranks ==
Police ranks of the Aruban Police Force
Rank	Chief Commissioner (Hoofdcommissaris)	Commissioner (commissaris)	Chief Inspector (Hoofdinspecteur)	Inspector 1st Class (Inspecteur 1e klas)	Inspector 2nd Class (Inspecteur 2e klas)	Deputy-Inspector (Onderinspecteur 1e klas)
Insignia						
Rank	Sergeant (Brigadier)	Senior Constable (Hoofdagent)	Constable (Agent)	Patrol Officer (Surveillant)	Trainee (Aspirant)	
Insignia						

== See also ==
- Law enforcement in the Netherlands
- Illegal drug trade in Aruba
- Europol
- Interpol
