= Minister Plenipotentiary of Aruba =

Minister of government of Aruba

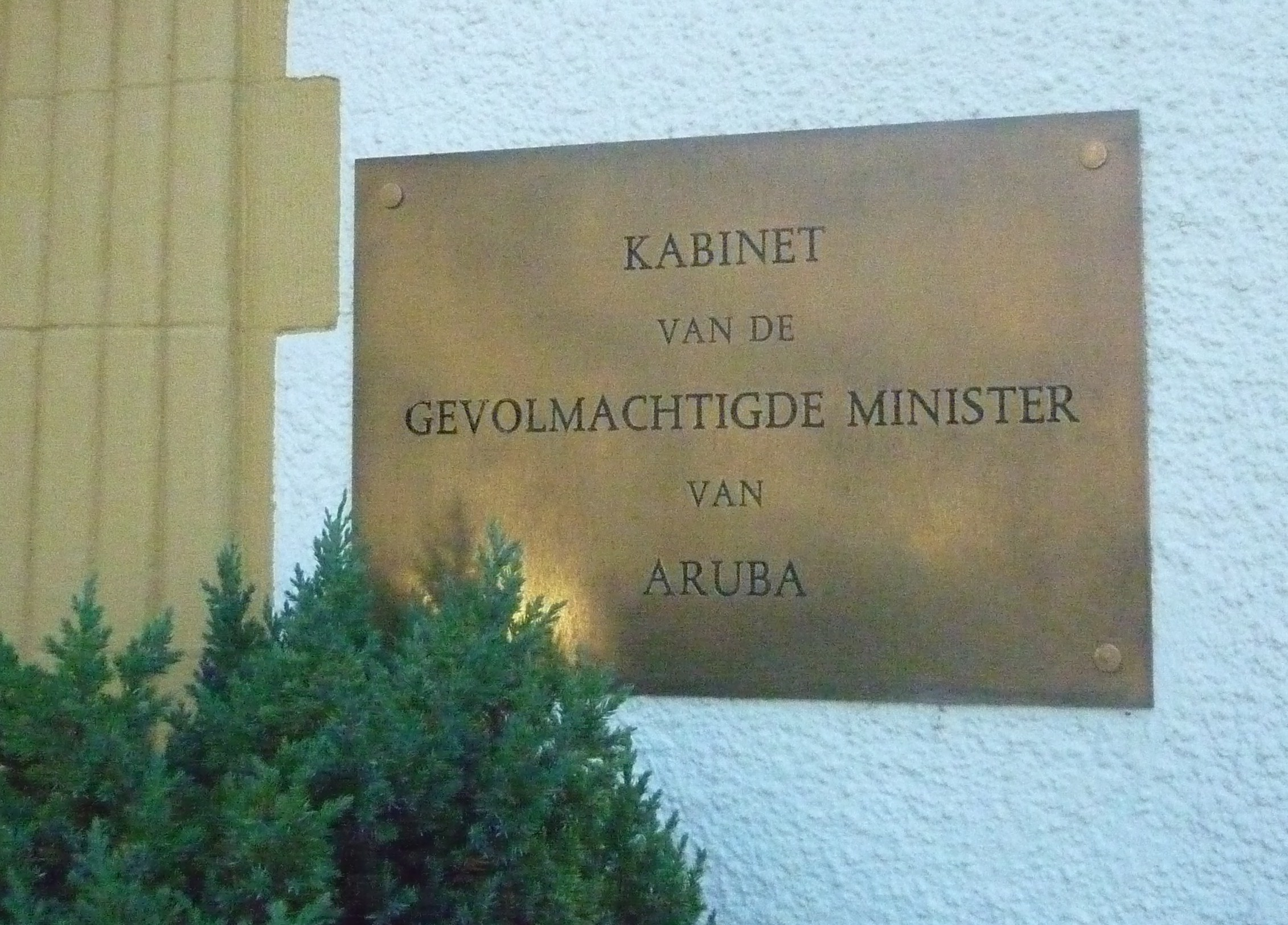
Plate on the Arubahuis in The Hague in the Netherlands in 2011

The Minister Plenipotentiary of Aruba (Dutch: Gevolmachtigde Minister van Aruba) represents the constituent country of Aruba in the Council of Ministers of the Kingdom of the Netherlands. The current Minister Plenipotentiary of Aruba is Ady Thijsen. The Minister Plenipotentiary and his cabinet are seated in the Arubahuis (Aruba House) in The Hague.

A significant difference between the Netherlands ministers and the Ministers Plenipotentiary is that the former ministers are accountable for their politics and policies to the Dutch parliament. The Ministers Plenipotentiary, however, are accountable to their national governments, which is the Estates of Aruba in case of Aruba. Therefore, the Ministers Plenipotentiary usually do not resign in the event of a Dutch cabinet crisis.

== List of ministers plenipotentiary of Aruba ==
The following table lists the ministers plenipotentiary of Aruba that have been in office since Aruba gained its status aparte in 1986:

Name	Period	Party
John Merryweather	January 10, 1986–February 11, 1989	PPA
R.H. Laclé	February 9, 1989–March 7, 1991	MEP
Ella Tromp-Yarzagaray	March 8, 1991–March 1, 1993	MEP
Candelario Wever	March 2, 1993–September 1994	MEP
Mito Croes	September 1994–October 30, 2001	AVP
Ella Tromp-Yarzagaray	October 30, 2001–November 7, 2005	MEP
Frido Croes	November 8, 2005–October 31, 2009	MEP
Edwin Abath	November 1, 2009–November 13, 2013	AVP
Alfonso Boekhoudt	November 14, 2013–November 17, 2016	AVP
Juan David Yrausquin	November 17, 2016–November 20, 2017	AVP
Guillfred Besaril	November 20, 2017–June 10, 2022	MEP
Ady Thijsen	October 13, 2022-	MEP
