= Ella Tromp-Yarzagaray =

Aruban politician

Hon. Alicia Angela Tromp-Yarzagaray

Governor of Aruba (acting)
- In office 2008–2016

Minister Plenipotentiary of Aruba
- In office 2001–2005

Member of the Parliament of Aruba
- In office 1994–2001

Minister of Finance
- In office 1993–1994

Minister Plenipotentiary of Aruba
- In office 1991–1993

Personal details
- Citizenship: Aruba

Alicia Angela Tromp-Yarzagaray, known as Ella Tromp-Yarzagaray, is an Aruban former politician of the People's Electoral Movement party. She was the first woman to hold the positions of Minister of Finance and Minister Plenipotentiary in the country.

== Biography ==
After graduating from Meer Uitgebreid Lager Onderwijs, comparable to junior high school, Ella obtained diplomas in bookkeeping, modern business administration, and introductory trade. Initially, she worked in business, but moved into education in 1976. She first worked as an Economic, Tourism, and Administrative Education teacher, then as an Economics teacher, and finally as a Secondary Administrative Education teacher.

Ella Tromp's political career began in 1989. She worked as an employee in the cabinet of the Prime Minister. On 9 March 1991 she was appointed Minister Plenipotentiary in the first cabinet of Nelson Oduber, a position which she held until 1 March 1993. She was the first woman in the history of the country to hold this position. She was also the first woman to be appointed as Minister of Finance, which she served as during Oduber's second cabinet. During her tenure as Minister of Finance, from 1993 to 1994, there was a quarrel between coalition members of the ruling government, which led to early elections and a shortened term. Despite this, she maintained firm control over government spending and for the first time in Aruba's status aparte period the country had a budget surplus.

From 1994 to 2001, Tromp was a Member of the Parliament of Aruba and sat on the People's Electoral Movement party board. From 30 October 2001 to 1 December 2005, she again served as Minister Plenipotentiary in Oduber's third cabinet. Upon the resignation of Christina van den Berg-de Freitas on 1 September 2008, she was appointed as acting Governor of Aruba. She resigned on November 1, 2016, and was succeeded by Yvonne Lacle-Dirksz.

== Awards ==
In 1992, Tromp was awarded the Order of Francisco de Miranda (1st Class) by Venezuela for her services as a representative of Aruba to the Kingdom Body, a consultative mechanism between Venezuela, the Netherlands, the Netherlands Antilles, and Aruba, from 1989 to 1991.

She is also a Knight in the Order of the Netherlands Lion, the highest Dutch civil order.
