= Guillfred Besaril =

Aruban politician

Minister Plenipotentiary of Aruba
- In office 20 November 2017 – 10 June 2022
- Monarch: Willem-Alexander
- Prime Minister: Evelyn Wever-Croes
- Deputy: Ady Thijsen (from 1 December 2021)
- Preceded by: Juan David Yrausquin
- Succeeded by: Ady Thijsen

President of the Estates of Aruba
- In office 27 October 2017 – 20 November 2017
- Succeeded by: Ady Thijsen

Member of the Estates of Aruba
- In office November 2013 – 20 November 2017

Personal details
- Born: 9 January 1974 (age 52) Savaneta, Aruba
- Party: People's Electoral Movement

Guillfred Francis Besaril (born 9 January 1974) is an Aruban politician of the People's Electoral Movement. He was Minister Plenipotentiary of Aruba between 20 November 2017 and 10 June 2022. He previously served in the Estates of Aruba between 2013 and November 2017, the last month as president.

== Career ==
Besaril was born in Savaneta on 9 January 1974. After attending high school he joined the Aruba Police Force in 1993. Besaril worked for the force until 2013. Between 2009 and 2013 Besaril was chairman of the Aruban Police Force union.

In the 2013 general election Besaril was elected with 833 votes to the Estates of Aruba for the People's Electoral Movement. Prior to the elections Besaril had shown ambition to become Minister of Justice in the new government. In November 2014 Besaril filed a police report against two Aruban People's Party politicians, for claims they made against him in the Estates.

During the 2017 general election Besaril was elected to the Estates with 503 votes. On 27 October he was elected President of the Estates. In the government of Evelyn Wever-Croes, Besaril was named Minister Plenipotentiary of Aruba. He succeeded Juan David Yrausquin on 20 November 2017. After the start of the COVID-19 pandemic and subsequent economic difficulties, Besaril and his fellow Ministers Plenipotentiary of Curaçao and Sint-Maarten argued for reforms in their respective countries, but asked to take into account the differences between the islands. Besaril served as negotiator for Aruba in the talks between Aruba and the Netherlands in the talks about financial oversight. In August 2020 Besaril won a case against an Aruban journalist who made false claims about him. In September 2021, after the 2021 Aruban general election, Wever-Croes reappointed Besaril in his position. Ady Thijsen became his deputy on 1 December 2021.

His term in office ended on 10 June 2022. Besaril was succeeded by Ady Thijsen. It later became public that in May 2021, Aruban Prime Minister Evelyn Wever-Croes had received e-mails by employees of the Arubahuis on the misuse of public funds by Besaril. In January 2023, Aruban MP's Arthur Dowers and Mike de Meza filed an indictment against Besaril, stating that Wevers-Croes had failed to act despite her knowledge of the case. In January 2023 the government of Aruba fired Besaril. In October 2023 the court of civil servants of Aruba found that Besaril was fired justly for serious dereliction of duty.

Between March and May 2025 Besaril was in trial for fraud, embezzlement and abuse of office. He stood trial together with the former director of the Arubahuis. The public prosecutor demanded 2 years imprisonment and a fine against Besaril. On 18 June 2025 Besaril was found guilty of embezzlement in a civil service capacity and abuse of office and was sentenced to 20 months imprisonment, of which 10 months were conditional. He was also sentenced to pay back 138,688 Aruban florin. His co-defendant was also found guilty. Besaril's lawyer filed an appeal against the sentence, but was too late in doing so. In October 2025 the Joint Court of Justice of Aruba, Curaçao, Sint Maarten, and of Bonaire, Sint Eustatius and Saba ruled the conviction thus became final.
