= Juan David Yrausquin =

Aruban politician

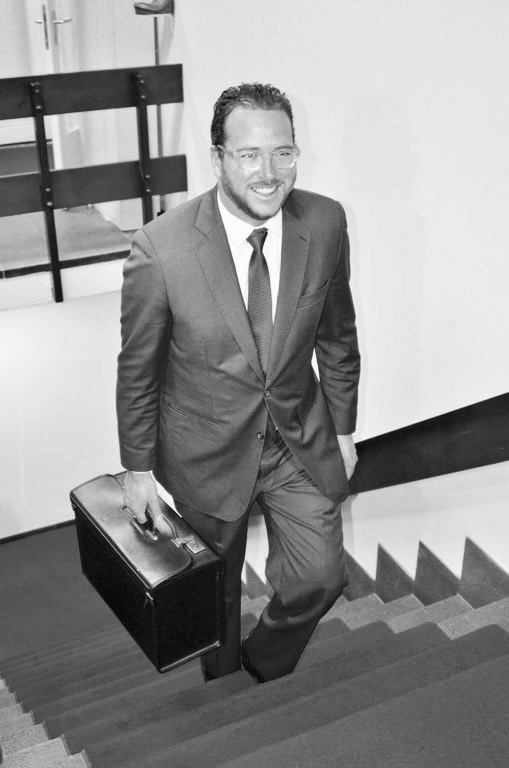
- Juan David Yrausquin

Minister Plenipotentiary of Aruba
- In office 17 November 2016 – 20 November 2017
- Monarch: Willem-Alexander
- Prime Minister: Mike Eman
- Preceded by: Alfonso Boekhoudt
- Succeeded by: Guillfred Besaril

Minister of Finance
- In office 30 October 2013 – 5 July 2014
- Prime Minister: Mike Eman
- Succeeded by: Angel Bermudez

Personal details
- Born: 1 January 1980 (age 46) Aruba

Juan David Yrausquin (born 1 January 1980) is an Aruban politician. He was Minister Plenipotentiary of Aruba between 17 November 2016 and 20 November 2017. He was Minister of Finance between 2013 and 2014 in the second Mike Eman cabinet.

== Career ==
In June 2009 Yrausquin joined the Aruban People's Party and in the September 2009 general elections he obtained a seat in the Estates of Aruba on the basis of preferential votes, while he was candidate number 29 on the list. On 30 October 2013 Yrausquin was named as Finance Minister in the second Mike Eman cabinet. On 5 July 2014 he resigned, citing "incredible abuse of power by the Dutch government in collaboration with the Governor (Fredis Refunjol)". The case related to the drafting of the 2014 government budget of Aruba. Yrausquin was succeeded by Angel Bermudez.

In November 2016 Yrausquin was announced as the new Minister Plenipotentiary of Aruba, succeeding Alfonso Boekhoudt. Yrausquin also announced to return to the Aruban People's Party, which he had left in 2014. He took office on 17 November. Yrausquin was succeeded by Guillfred Besaril on 20 November 2017.
