= 1994 Aruban general election =

- 29 July 1994
- All 21 seats in Parliament; 11 seats needed for a majority
| Party | Leader | Vote % | Seats | +/– |
|---|---|---|---|---|
| AVP | Henny Eman | 45.40 | 10 | +1 |
| MEP | Nelson Oduber | 39.02 | 9 | 0 |
| OLA | | 11.16 | 2 | +1 |
This lists parties that won seats. See the complete results below.
| Prime Minister before | Prime Minister after |
|---|---|
| Nelson Oduber; PEM | Henny Eman; AVP |

General elections were held in Aruba on 29 July 1994. The Aruban People's Party (AVP) emerged as the largest party, winning ten of the 21 seats in the Estates. The AVP formed a coalition government with the Aruban Liberal Organization with Henny Eman as Prime Minister.

== Results ==
| Party | Votes | % | Seats | +/– |
|---|---|---|---|---|
| Aruban People's Party | 17,963 | 45.40 | 10 | +1 |
| People's Electoral Movement | 15,437 | 39.02 | 9 | 0 |
| Aruban Liberal Organization | 4,415 | 11.16 | 2 | +1 |
| Aruban Patriotic Party | 1,751 | 4.43 | 0 | –1 |
| Total | 39,566 | 100.00 | 21 | 0 |
| Valid votes | 39,566 | 98.95 | | |
| Invalid/blank votes | 420 | 1.05 | | |
| Total votes | 39,986 | 100.00 | | |
| Registered voters/turnout | 46,848 | 85.35 | | |
Source: Caribbean Elections
