= Mito Croes =

Aruban politician

Minister Plenipotentiary of Aruba
- In office 1994–2001
- Preceded by: Candelario Wever
- Succeeded by: Ella Tromp-Yarzagaray

Council of State
- In office September 2014 – 1 June 2016

Personal details
- Born: Antonito Gordiano Croes; 10 May 1946; Aruba
- Died: 7 August 2016 (aged 70); Aruba
- Political party: Aruban People's Party

Antonito Gordiano "Mito" Croes (10 May 1946 – 7 August 2016) was an Aruban politician of the Aruban People's Party. He served as Minister Plenipotentiary of Aruba from 1994 to 2001. He previously served as member of the Estates and government minister of the Netherlands Antilles and Aruba.

== Early and personal life ==
Croes was born on Aruba on 10 May 1946. He studied law at Leiden University and the Katholieke Hogeschool Tilburg in the Netherlands.

Croes started working as a civil servant in 1975. He later became head of the department of the governmental structure of the Netherlands Antilles, as which he served until 1980. Croes subsequently was scientific employee at the University of the Netherlands Antilles from 1980 to 1982.

In May 2006 he earned his degree in jurisprudence from Tilburg University under Ernst Hirsch Ballin, with a dissertation titled:"De herdefiniëring van het Koninkrijk".

Croes was a Knight in the Order of the Netherlands Lion. He also held a distinction in the Venezuelan Order of Francisco de Miranda. Croes died on 7 August 2016 in Oranjestad, Aruba, aged 70.

== Political career ==
Croes started his political career for the Aruban People's Party as a member of the Island Council of Aruba. From early to November 1982 Croes served as member of the Estates of the Netherlands Antilles. He subsequently became Minister of Political Structure of the Netherlands Antilles and also temporarily served as Minister of Justice until August 1983. Croes then returned to the Estates of the Netherlands Antilles, of which he stayed member until 1986, when Aruba gained its status as a constituent country within the Kingdom of the Netherlands. Croes subsequently was appointed as the country's first Minister for Welfare Affairs (Education, Culture, Employment and Social Affairs).

Croes remained Minister until February 1989. He then became member of the Estates of Aruba. Croes remained member until September 1994 when he was appointed as Minister Plenipotentiary of Aruba. He kept this position until October 2001.

Later Croes tried to obtain the right for Arubans to vote in the European Parliament elections. Together with later Minister Benny Sevinger was involved in judicial procedures ending at the European Court of Justice, where the right to vote was declared. Croes was a candidate for the Christian Democratic Appeal in the 2009 European Parliament election. He held the eleventh place on the candidate list. He succeeded in obtaining 13,000 of the 14,000 votes on Aruba, but did not gain a seat.

Croes was appointed to the Council of State of the Kingdom of the Netherlands for Aruba in September 2014. He succeeded Hubert Maduro. His appointment had been delayed for several months due to political difficulties between Aruba and the Netherlands. Croes resigned on 1 June 2016.

Croes served as political adviser to Aruban Prime Minister Mike Eman, with the two calling almost daily. Eman described him as: "possibly the most knowledgeable person on the political structure within the Kingdom of the Netherlands".
