= Kroes =

Kroes is a Dutch surname. Notable people with the surname include:

- Doutzen Kroes (born 1985), Dutch model and actress
- Evert Kroes (born 1950), Dutch rower
- Hans Kroes (born 1965), Dutch swimmer
- Iris Kroes (born 1992), Dutch singer and harpist
- Neelie Kroes (born 1941), Dutch politician
- Wolter Kroes (born 1968), Dutch singer

== See also ==
- Croes
