= Mervin Wyatt-Ras =

President of the Parliament of Aruba

Former President of the Parliament of Aruba Mervin Wyatt-Ras
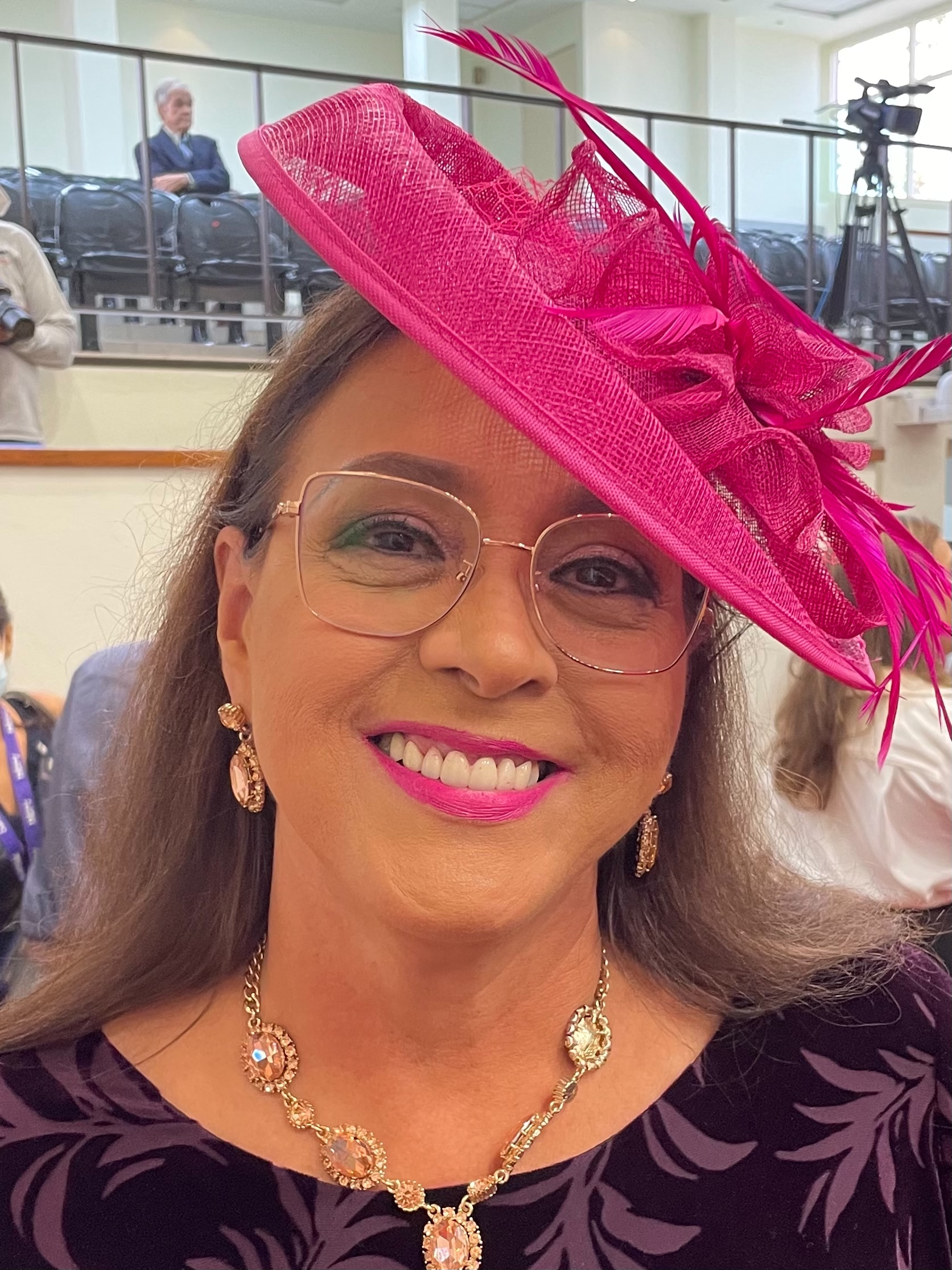

Mervin Glorinda Wyatt-Ras (born October 20, 1961) is an Aruban politician and member of the Parliament of Aruba since October 20, 2001. She was President of the Parliament between 2005 and 2009 and between 2016 and 2017.

== See also ==
- List of the first women holders of political offices in North America
- List of presidents of the Parliament of Aruba
- Rudy Croes
