= List of presidents of the Parliament of Aruba =

Aruba Parliament Presidents

Below is a list of the speakers of the Parliament of Aruba.

Name	Entered office	Left office
A. J. Booi	January 1986	February 1986
P. (Pedro) Bislik	February 1986	July 1987
H. E. (Hector) Gonzalez	August 1987	February 1989
F. B. (Felix) Flanegin	February 1989	August 1994
M. V. (Marco) Christiaans	August 1994	January 1998
C. A. D. (Booshi) Wever	January 1998	June 1998
P. E. (Eddie) Croes	June 1998	February 2001
F. W. (Frido) Croes	October 2001	May 2004
M. F. (Marlon) Werleman	May 2004	October 2005
H. R. (Rudy) Croes	October 2005	November 2005
M. G. (Mervin) Wyatt-Ras	November 2005	October 2009
R. (Andy) Lee	October 2009	June 2010
P. F. T. Croes	June 2010	October 2013
Marisol J. Lopez-Tromp	October 2013	September 2015
M. G. (Mervin) Wyatt-Ras	September 2015	October 2017
Guillfred Besaril	October 2017	November 2017
J.E (Ady) Thijsen	November 2017	8 July 2021
Edgar Vrolijk	8 July 2021	10 September 2024
Raymond Kamperveen	10 September 2024	8 January 2025
Gerlien Croes	8 January 2025	27 March 2025
Marlon Sneek	27 March 2025	Present

== Sources ==
http://www.parlamento.aw/index.php?mediumid=1&pagid=134
