= Betico Croes =

Aruban politician

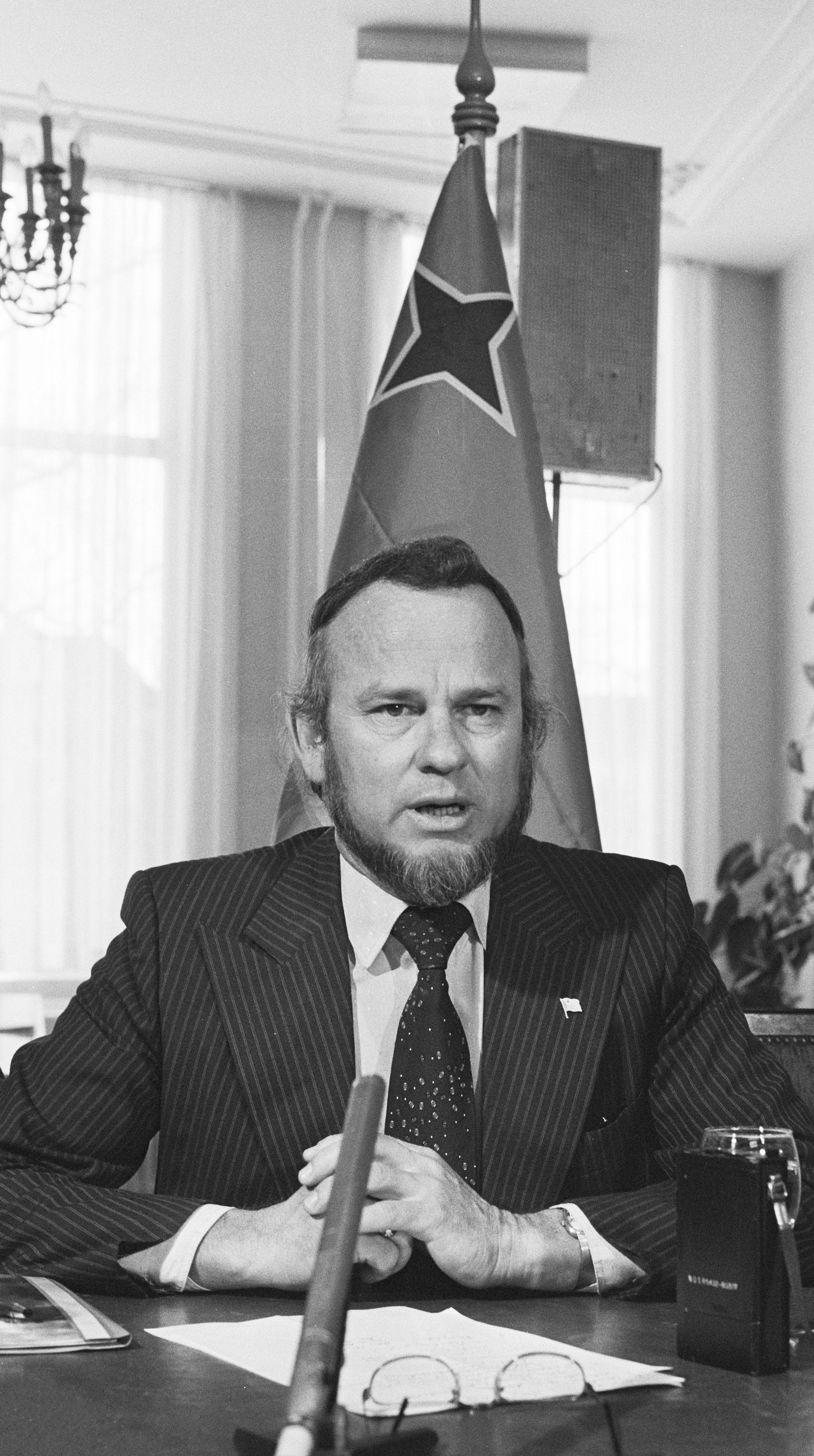
- Croes in 1982
- Born: Gilberto François Croes; 25 January 1938; Santa Cruz, Aruba
- Died: 26 November 1986 (aged 48); Utrecht, Netherlands
- Occupations: teacher, politician
- Children: 2 sons, 2 daughters
- Parents: Panchico Croes (father); Mimita Croes (mother)

Gilberto François "Betico" Croes (Papiamento pronunciation: [beˈtiko kɾus]; 25 January 1938 – 26 November 1986) was an Aruban political activist who was a proponent for Aruba's separation from the Netherlands Antilles and independence from the Kingdom of the Netherlands. Separation from the Netherlands Antilles eventually occurred in 1986, but following a car accident on 31 December 1985 (the night of status aparte), Croes lapsed into a coma and never became conscious to see his accomplishment. He is best remembered as Libertador (liberator) and as the father of the Aruban people.

== Biography and career ==
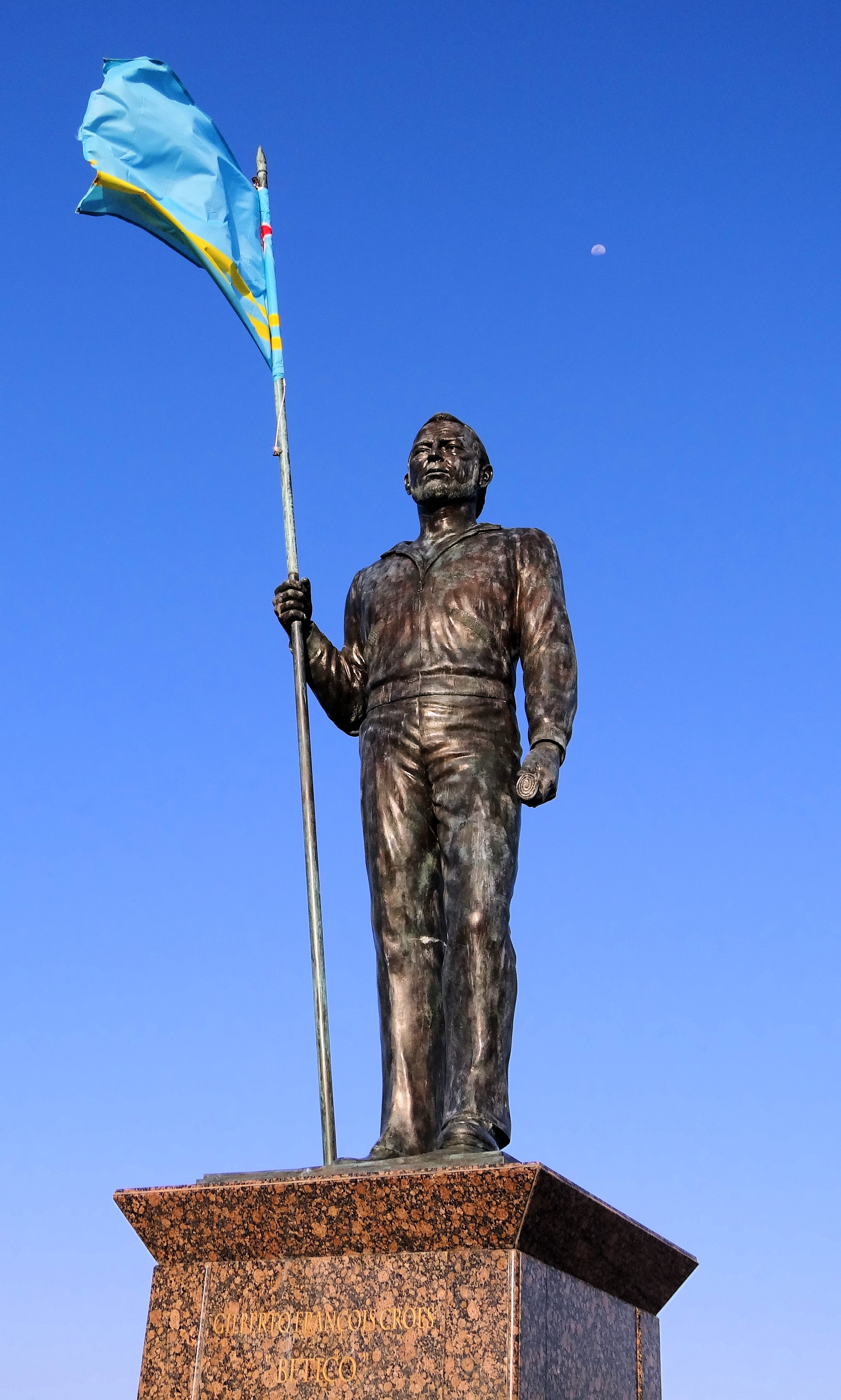
A monument on Plaza Betico Croes in Oranjestad, Aruba, showing "Betico" Croes holding an Aruban flag.

Croes was born on 25 January 1938, in Santa Cruz. After finishing high school, he studied in the Netherlands at the Teacher's Training College in Hilversum and received his headmaster's certificate in 1959.

In 1967, Croes first participated in the island council of Aruba as a member of the Aruban People's Party (AVP) and was elected. He resigned in July 1970 after the AVP had decided not to give a seat to the UNA.

In February 1971, Croes founded the political party People's Electoral Movement (Movimiento Electoral di Pueblo), and was elected to the island council. In 1973, the MEP won 5 of the 8 seats for Aruba in the Estates of the Netherlands Antilles. In 1976 he was the person responsible for the Seal Flag and National Anthem of the island of Aruba. It was co-written by renowned Padu Del Caribe (Padu Lampe), and Rufo Wever, who also composed the anthem.

=== Background ===
In 1954, the Netherlands Antilles became a constituent country of the Kingdom of the Netherlands and was given self-government. Aruba is the second most populous island, however, Curaçao is the largest and most populous island. Aruba had 8 seats in the Estates of the Netherlands Antilles, Curaçao had 12 seats, Bonaire had one seat, and Saba, Sint Eustatius, and Sint Maarten shared a single seat. The Capital of the Netherlands Antilles was Willemstad, Curaçao.

=== Struggle for independence ===
In 1977, Croes organized a referendum regarding Aruba's independence. The Aruban Patriotic Party (PPA) announced a boycott of the referendum, and the Government of the Netherlands Antilles declared the referendum illegal, and announced, prior to the referendum, that it was not willing to accept the results. In the March 1977 referendum, 95% of the voters were in favor of independence.

In June 1977, Boy Rozendal of the Democratic Party of Curaçao won a clear victory in the elections in the Netherlands Antilles. No former was assigned to create a new cabinet instead Rozendal, who was an opponent of Aruban autonomy, installed his coalition without consulting the MEP. Croes announced demonstrations and a boycott of Curaçaoan products.

On 11 August 1977, a general strike (1977 Aruba general strike) shut down the island during which the riot police made multiple charges. On 18 August, the union leaders were arrested and the strike ended, however, Prime Minister Joop den Uyl of the Netherlands started a dialogue because the situation had spun out of control.

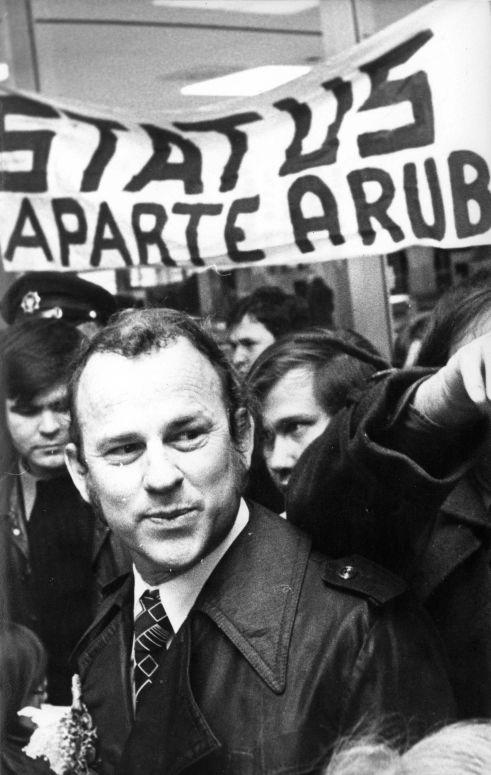
Croes (1976)

In February 1981, at the Round Table Conference, Croes formally set Aruba's Independence for 1991, however the Round Table Conference of 1983, resulted in a proposed new Charter for the Kingdom of the Netherlands in which Aruba would have a Status Aparte making it a constituent country within the Kingdom in 1986, and possible independence in 1996.

On 24 April 1983, Croes was shot in the stomach by police officer Libier. Libier was transferred to Bonaire in June, In November, the Public Prosecution Service decided not to charge him, because there was no proof that he had aimed at Croes.

In July 1985 the charter, as agreed in March 1983, in Aruba's Decolonization and Independence Agreement, was unanimously approved by the island council of Aruba, however, the PPA boycotted the vote. The Status Aparte would take effect on 1 January 1986.

In the 1980s Croes recommended that Aruba should target tourism in order to diversify the economy since it depended mainly on the refinery. He was also responsible for major projects for the people of Aruba, like the housing company FCCA, and the transportation company Arubus,

=== 1985 elections and death ===
Party	Votes	%	Seats	+/–
People's Electoral Movement	13,786	37.62	8	–5
Aruban People's Party	11,480	31.33	7	+2
Aruban Patriotic Party	4,499	12.28	2	–1
Aruban Democratic Party	3,661	9.99	2	New
National Democratic Alliance	3,216	8.78	2	New
Total	36,642	100.00	21	0
Source: Aruba Blue Pages

In November 1985, the MEP emerged as the largest party in the elections but was unable to form a government. Henny Eman of the Aruban People's Party (AVP) would become the first Prime Minister of Aruba.

On 31 December 1985, Croes was in a traffic accident and lapsed into a coma. Croes died on 26 November 1986 in a reactivation and nursing center in Utrecht, Netherlands. His remains were flown to Aruba for burial. An estimated 40,000 people attended his funeral (Aruba had an estimated 65,000 inhabitants in 1985).

A famous quote from him is "Si mi cai na caminda, gara e bandera y sigui cu e lucha" (If I fall along the way, grab the flag and continue the battle).

== Personal life ==
Croes had four children: two sons—Glenbert Croes and Gilberto Junior Croes and two daughters—Glendeline Croes and Guisette Croes.

Both of Croes' sons served as Ministers and Glenbert is as of 2021 in office as Minister of Labor, Integration and Energy.

== Legacy ==
- Betico Croes Day is celebrated on his birthday of 25 January as a national holiday.
- The 18 Maart Plein in Oranjestad was renamed Plaza Betico Croes.
- Caya G. F. Betico Croes is named after him and is the main shopping street of Oranjestad, the Aruban capital.
