= Ady Thijsen =

Aruban politician (born 1958)

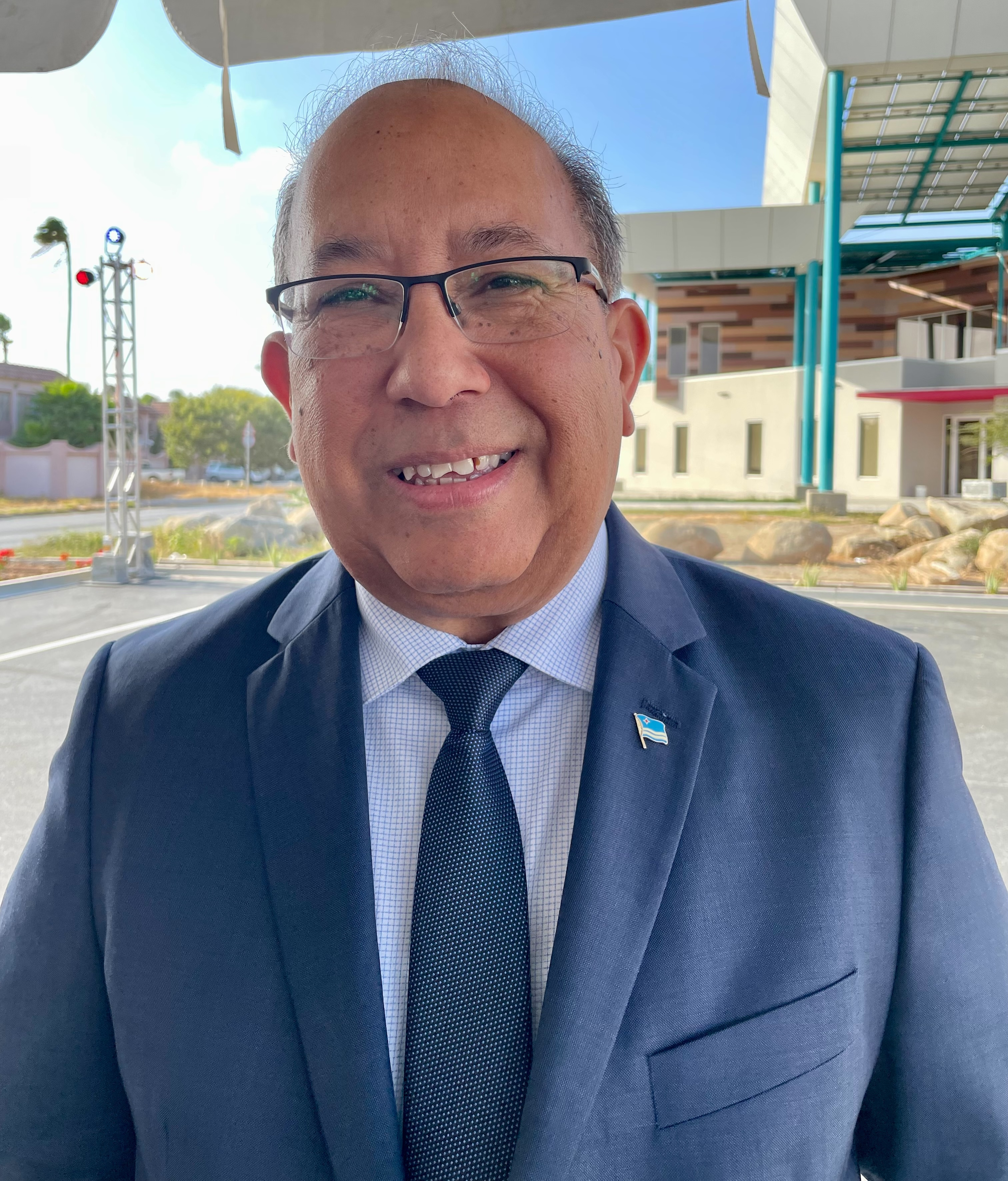
- Thijsen in 2023

Minister Plenipotentiary of Aruba
- Incumbent
- Assumed office 13 October 2022 (caretaker from 5 July 2022)
- Monarch: Willem-Alexander
- Prime Minister: Evelyn Wever-Croes
- Preceded by: Guillfred Besaril

Permanent Representative of Aruba to the European Union
- Incumbent
- Assumed office 1 December 2021
- Preceded by: Eddy Paris

Deputy Minister Plenipotentiary of Aruba
- In office 1 December 2021 – 13 October 2022

President of the Parliament of Aruba
- In office 27 November 2017 – July 2021
- Preceded by: Guillfred Besaril
- Succeeded by: Edgar Vrolijk

Member of the Parliament of Aruba
- In office 2005 – 1 December 2021

Personal details
- Born: Juan Edberto Thijsen; 8 November 1958 (age 67) Aruba
- Party: People's Electoral Movement
- Education: Tilburg University
- Occupation: Politician, lawyer

Juan Edberto "Ady" Thijsen (born 8 November 1958) is an Aruban politician. He has served as Minister Plenipotentiary of Aruba since 2022 and Permanent Representative of Aruba to the European Union since December 2021. He had been Deputy Minister Plenipotentiary from 2021. Thijsen was member of the Parliament of Aruba for the People's Electoral Movement between 2005 and 2021, and served as its President between 2017 and 2021.

== Early life and career ==
Thijsen was born on Aruba on 8 November 1958. He attended the Middelbaar algemeen voortgezet onderwijs, hoger algemeen voortgezet onderwijs and ultimately voorbereidend wetenschappelijk onderwijs. Thijsen started working at age 18 and held various jobs including gardener, dishwasher and croupier. He studied law at Tilburg University in the Netherlands and obtained his degree in 1997. Thijsen worked as a lawyer for several law firms in Aruba and later opened his own law firm. Thijsen is specialized in labour law and constitutional law. He worked as lawyer for the Aruban Workers' Federation.

== Political career ==
In the 2005 Aruban general election he was elected to the Parliament of Aruba for the People's Electoral Movement (MEP). He later became parliamentary leader for the MEP. During 2010 Thijsen, together with C.A.S.D. (Evelyna) Wever, proposed an amendement in the Dutch House of Representatives to introduce a mandatory referendum after the Landsverordening was changed. The amendment was rejected, with only 6 supporting out of possible 150 representatives. Thijsen has argued for a dispute resolution system for the Kingdom of the Netherlands. In June 2013 he was in a brawl with fellow member of parliament Melvin Tromp and filed charges against him. In 2016 he served as Aruba's special delegate for kingdom acts regarding Dutch nationality law and visa requirements.

Thijsen was elected President of the Parliament of Aruba on 27 November 2017, he succeeded Guillfred Besaril. In this position he chaired the Interparlementair Koninkrijksoverleg (Interparliamentary Kingdom consultation) in January 2018. In June 2019 he was critical of the Dutch government for refusing to provide funds to deal with influx of refugees in Aruba originating from the crisis in Venezuela. Thijsen announced his decision to enter the 2021 Aruban general election in April 2021, making it the fifth elections in which he stood candidate. He served as President of Parliament until July 2021 and was succeeded by Edgar Vrolijk. In September 2021 he announced he would take up his seat in Parliament after having postponed the decision to the last possible day. Thijsen remained member of the Parliament until 1 December 2021.

On 1 December 2021 he was named Permanent Representative of Aruba to the European Union and Deputy Minister Plenipotentiary of Aruba. He succeeded Eddy Paris as Permanent Representative. On 5 July 2022 he was named Minister Plenipotentiary of Aruba, succeeding Guillfred Besaril. He was the first individual to undergo screening for such a position under the stricter screening law. Together with the interim director of the Arubahuis he was charged with restructuring the institution by Aruban Prime Minister Evelyn Wever-Croes. On 13 October 2022 he was formally sworn in by the Governor of Aruba, Alfonso Boekhoudt. He remained in function as Permanent Representative of Aruba to the European Union.

== Personal life ==
Thijsen is married and has four children.
