= 1989 Aruban general election =

- 7 January 1989

All 21 seats in Parliament 11 seats needed for a majority
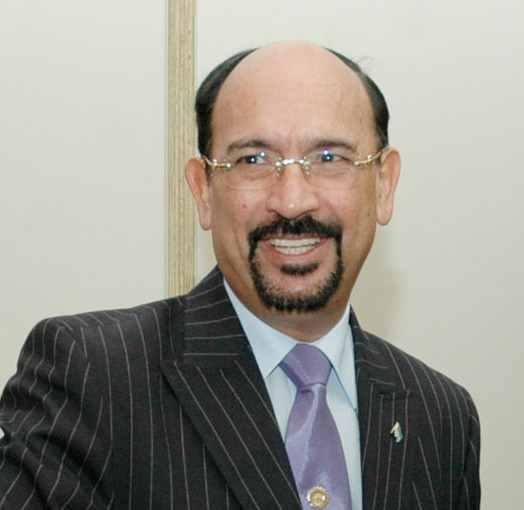

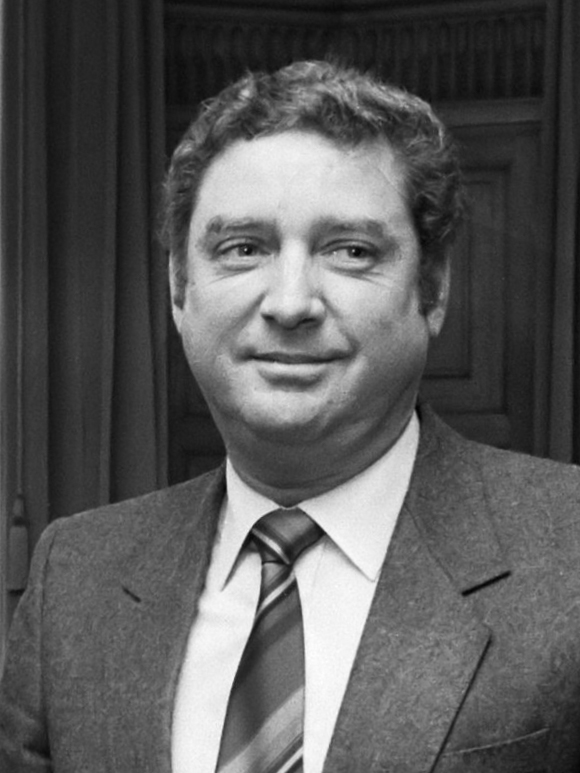
	First party	Second party	Third party
			ADN
Leader	Nelson Oduber	Henny Eman
Party	PEM	AVP	ADN
Seats before	8	7	2
Seats won	10	8	1
Seat change	▲2	▲1	▼1
Popular vote	16,555	12,668	2,298
Percentage	45.95%	35.16%	6.38%
Swing	▲8.33pp	▲3.83pp	▼3.61pp
	Fourth party	Fifth party
	NPP	PPA
Party	NNP	PPA
Seats before	—	2
Seats won	1	1
Seat change	New	▼1
Popular vote	1,874	1,772
Percentage	5.20%	4.92%
Swing	New	▼7.36pp
Prime Minister before election
Henny Eman
AVP
Elected Prime Minister
Nelson Oduber
PEM

General elections were held in Aruba on 7 January 1989. The People's Electoral Movement (MEP) emerged as the largest party, winning ten of the 21 seats in the Estates. The MEP formed a three-party coalition government with the Aruban Democratic Party and the Aruban Patriotic Party, with Nelson Oduber becoming prime minister.

== Results ==
Party	Votes	%	Seats	+/–
People's Electoral Movement	16,555	45.95	10	+2
Aruban People's Party	12,668	35.16	8	+1
National Democratic Alliance	2,298	6.38	1	–1
New Patriotic Party	1,874	5.20	1	New
Aruban Patriotic Party	1,772	4.92	1	–1
Aruban Democratic Party	694	1.93	0	–2
Democratic Action 1986	171	0.47	0	New
Total	36,032	100.00	21	0
Source: Caribbean Elections
