= Olindo Koolman =

Aruban politician (born 1942)

2nd Governor of Aruba
- In office 29 January 1992 – 11 August 2004
- Monarch: Beatrix
- Preceded by: Felipe Tromp
- Succeeded by: Fredis Refunjol

Personal details
- Born: 15 April 1942 (age 84) Aruba, Territory of Curaçao
- Occupation: civil servant and administrator

Olindo Koolman (born 15 April 1942) is an Aruban former politician who served as the second governor of Aruba and served two terms of six years as governor from 29 January 1992 until 11 August 2004.

== Biography ==
Koolman was born on 15 April 1942 in Aruba. He studied law, and in 1966 became a civil servant in the taxation office. Koolman was a member of the commission which prepared the status aparte of Aruba in which the island became a constituent country within the Kingdom of the Netherlands. In 1986 he started working as an inspector of customs and excise.

On 29 January 1992, he became governor of Aruba and served until 11 August 2004. His candidacy was disputed because he had not been involved in Aruban politics previously. Following his swearing in, Koolman stressed the importance of human rights, protection of the environment, and prosecution of the war against drug trafficking as his main goals. In 1997 he vetoed a proposed MEP-OLA cabinet in September, and rejected prospective financial minister Carlos Mansur. In late 1998 to 1999, a dispute arose over whether candidate minister Glenbert Croes, the head of the opposition party Aruban Liberal Organization, could become a minister in his cabinet. Koolman refused the appointment because Croes was the subject of a criminal investigation on fraud. Koolman submitted the case to the Council of State. In 1999 again refused to appoint him as Minister of Transport and Communications.

Since April 2004 he has created a foundation under his name, which was later included in the Paradise Papers.

Government offices
Preceded by Felipe Tromp	Governor of Aruba; 1992–2004	Succeeded by Fredis Refunjol
