= John Merryweather =

Aruban politician (1932–2019)

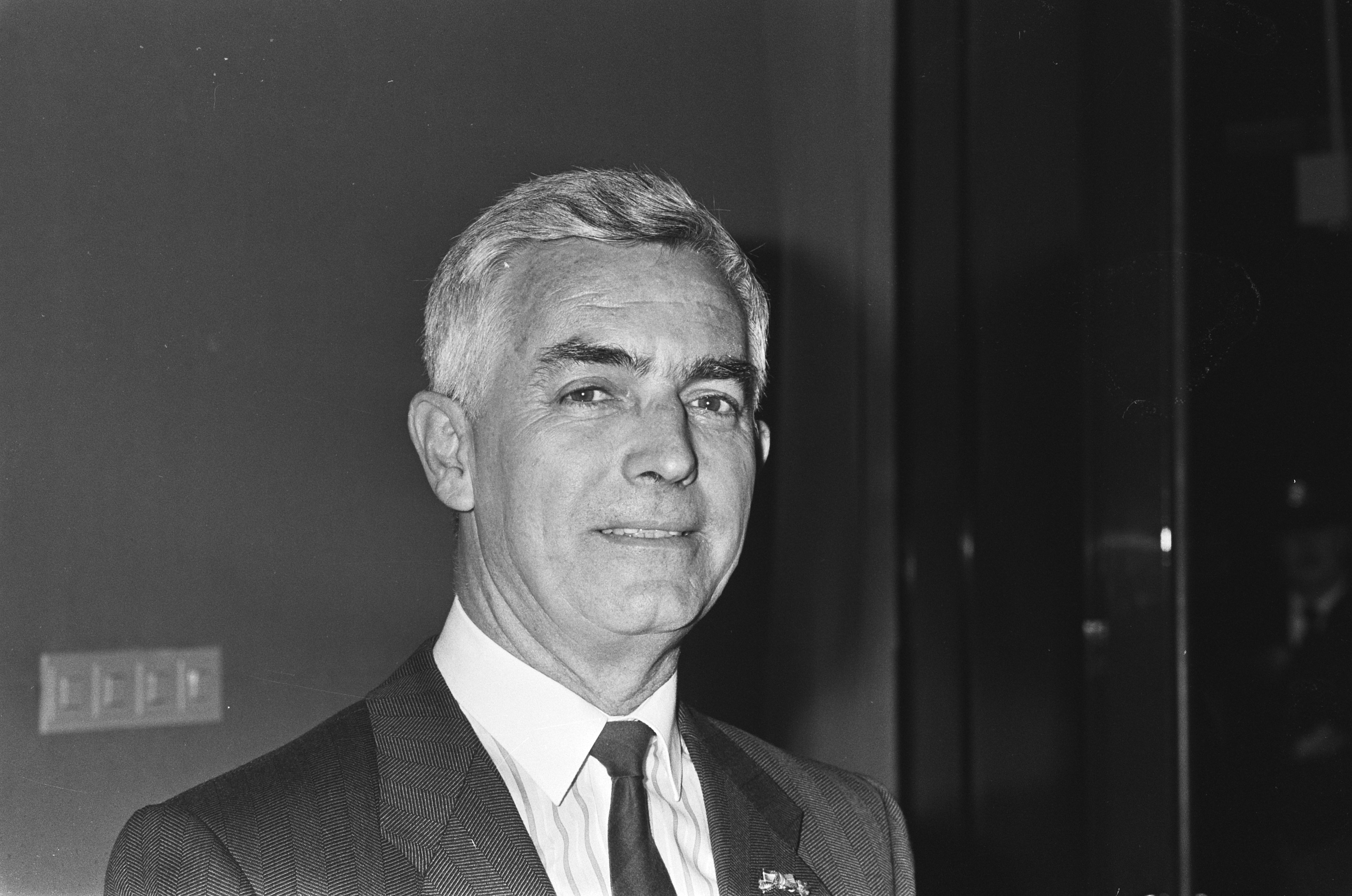
- Merryweather (1986)

Minister Plenipotentiary of Aruba
- In office 10 January 1986 – 11 February 1989
- Preceded by: office established
- Succeeded by: Roland Laclé

Personal details
- Born: John William Merryweather; 25 May 1932 Aruba
- Died: 24 September 2019 (aged 87) Aruba
- Party: Aruban Patriotic Party (PPA)
- Occupation: landscape architect and politician

John William Merryweather (25 May 1932 – 24 September 2019) was an Aruban landscape architect and politician. He served as the first Minister Plenipotentiary of Aruba from 1986 until 1989.

== Biography ==
Merryweather was born on 25 May 1932 in Aruba, as the son of British father and an Aruban mother. He went to high school in Jamaica and the United States. He studied at the Loughborough University in England, and specialised in landscape architecture in the United States.

In 1952, Merryweather started to work in the oil industry. In 1961, he became head of the park service in Aruba. In 1962, he became the Aruban representative of the newly formed National Park Agency (then STINAPA, nowadays CARMABI). In 1969, he became head of the Curaçaoan park service. In 1978, he became head of the Aruban tourism agency.

In 1983, Merryweather became a member of the Aruban Patriotic Party (PPA), and was elected to the island council of Aruba. In April 1984, he resigned from the island council, and was appointed to the cabinet of the Minister Plenipotentiary of the Netherlands Antilles in The Hague, Netherlands.

On 1 January 1986, the Status aparte of Aruba came into effect, which made Aruba a constituent country within the Kingdom of the Netherlands. The country was to be represented by a Minister Plenipotentiary in the Council of Ministers of the Kingdom of the Netherlands. On 10 January, Merryweather was appointed first Minister Plenipotentiary of Aruba, and served until 11 February 1989.

After his tenure as minister, Merryweather served as head of the European tourism agency for Aruba. In 1990, Merryweather became president of Nationaal Fonds Sports Gehandicapten (NFSG), a charitable fund for handicapped sports in the Netherlands. During his lifetime, Merryweather had been active in several sport organisations, and served as football manager of SV Racing Club Aruba on multiple occasions.

On 24 September 2019, Merryweather died in Aruba, at the age of 87.

== Honours and legacy ==
- Netherlands Knight of the Order of the Netherlands Lion
- Netherlands Knight of the Order of Orange-Nassau
- On Koningsdag, the "Merryweatherbeker" is awarded to the winner of the Aruban youth football tournament.
