= Jeannette Richardson-Baars =

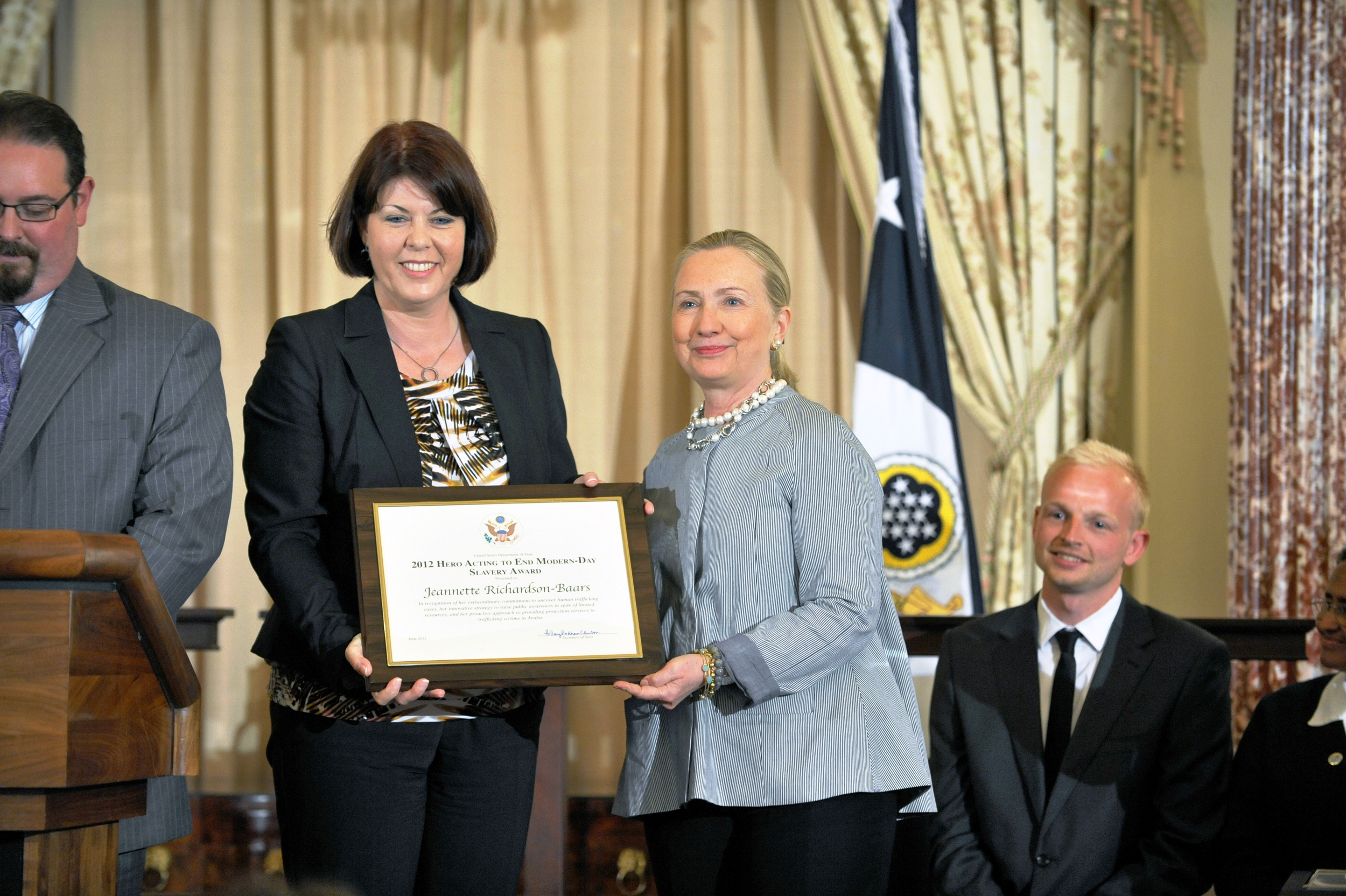
- Jeanette Richardson-Baars with then Secretary of State Hillary Clinton
- Born: Netherlands
- Occupation: Director of the Aruba Police Academy
- Known for: Anti-human trafficking

Jeanette Richardson-Baars is the Director of the Aruba Police Academy, holding the rank of chief inspector in the Aruba Police Force. She was honored on 19 June 2012 by the U.S. Department of State with the annual Trafficking in Persons report for her efforts in combating human trafficking. This prestigious award is designed to raise public awareness of modern-day slavery and in 2012, had only been awarded to 110 people worldwide. When she heard of the award, Richardson-Baars said "It is an Aruba TIP Task Force team effort. I could not be regarded a hero without a great team".

== Work in fighting human trafficking ==
Working without a budget, Mrs. Richardson-Baars used her personal computer to design posters in several languages (primarily Papiamento and Dutch) targeted at locals and tourists. By advocating to the Dutch government, she was able to obtain a nationwide memorandum that allowed victims of human trafficking to be given refuge off the island of Aruba. Richardson-Baars, through the inter-agency committee to which she was vital, uncovered sex trafficking and slave labor activity.
