= Felipe Tromp =

His Excellency Felipe Tromp
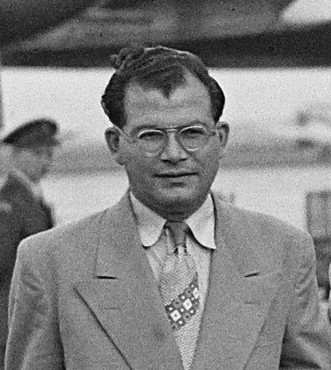
- Felipe Tromp (1950)

1st Governor of Aruba
- In office 1 January 1986 – 12 March 1992
- Monarch: Beatrix
- Preceded by: Office established
- Succeeded by: Olindo Koolman

Minister of Education in the Netherlands Antilles
- In office 1958–1962

Personal details
- Born: Felipe Benito Tromp; 15 October 1917 Aruba
- Died: 12 August 1995 (aged 77) Aruba
- Party: Aruba National Union (UNA)

Felipe Benito Tromp (15 October 1917 – 12 August 1995) was the first governor of Aruba after Aruba received a status aparte within the Kingdom of the Netherlands. He worked as a teacher prior to becoming governor and served as Minister for Education in the Antilles (1958–1962). He took office as governor on 1 January 1986 and left office on 12 March 1992. He was succeeded by Olindo Koolman.

== Biography ==
Felipe Tromp was born on 15 October 1917 in Aruba. After finishing his ULO (junior high school), he moved to the Netherlands for his teaching degree. In 1945, he returned to Aruba and started to work as a teacher. In 1949, he was first elected to the Estates of the Netherlands Antilles. On 17 October 1948, Tromp was one of the founding members of Aruba National Union (UNA).

Between 1951 and 1955, Tromp was elected to the Estates of Aruba, and participated in the round table conference about the future of the Netherlands Antilles. Between 1958 and 1962, he served as Minister of Education. In 1978, Tromp retired. In 1986, Aruba broke away from the Netherlands Antilles and was granted a status aparte within the Kingdom of the Netherlands. This resulted in the new position of Governor of Aruba being created. On 1 January 1986, he was appointed as the first governor of Aruba and served until 1992.

Tromp swore in the first self-governing Aruban cabinet under the new system, which initially envisaged Aruban independence in 1996. After he left office in 1992, he was awarded the Grand Cross of the Order of Orange-Nassau and a new trophy named the "Governor Felipe B. Tromp Jeugdbeker" was created to be awarded to a young Aruban whom had excelled in sport or culture, to be awarded annually every Koningsdag.

Tromp died on 12 August 1995, at the age of 77.

== Honours ==
- Grand Cross of the Order of Orange-Nassau (12 March 1992)
- An elementary school in Noord was named in his honour.

Government offices
New creation	Governor of Aruba; 1986–1992	Succeeded by Olindo Koolman
