= Ministry of Justice (Aruba) =

The Ministry of Justice is the Aruban Ministry responsible for justice, imprisonment and public security. The Ministry was created in 1986, following Aruba's Status aparte" Per an ordinance passed in 2002, the ministry is organized as follows

- The Directorate of Judicial Affairs.
- The Support Office.
- The Executive Services
- The Attorney General's Office
- The Registry of the Common Courts of the Netherlands Antilles and Aruba.

The Attorney General serves as the legal adviser to the Minister of Justice.

== List of ministers of justice ==
Ministers of Justice
No.	Minister of Justice	Took office	Left office	Party	Ministry
1	Edgar W. Vos	1986	1989	AVP	Minister of Justice & Public Health
2	Hendrik Croes	1990	1994	MEP	Ministry of Justice & Sport
3	Edgar W. Vos	1994	2001	AVP	Ministry of Justice & Public Works
4	Eddy Croes	February 2001	October 2001	MEP	Ministry of Justice & Public Works
5	Rudy Croes	2001	2008	MEP	Ministry of Justice
6	Arthur Dowers	2009	2016	AVP	Ministry of Justice & Education
7	Andin Bikker	2016	2021	POR	Minister of Justice & Immigration
8	Rocco Tjon	2021	incumbent	MEP	Ministry of Justice & Social Affairs

== See also ==
- Justice ministry
- Politics of Aruba
