= Illegal drug trade in Aruba =

The illegal drug trade in Aruba involves trans-shipment of cocaine and other drugs through Aruba to the United States.

== Background ==
Corruption in Aruba is so widespread that Claire Sterling, widely acclaimed for her works on drugs and crime, said of it: "The world's first independent mafia state emerged in 1993." The Italian daily Corriere della Sera described Aruba as "the first state to be bought by the bosses Cosa Nostra." Between 1988 and 1992 the Cuntrera-Caruana Mafia clan was said to have acquired 60% of Aruba through investments in hotels, casinos and the election-campaign of a Prime Minister. As a result of the public outcry, Aruba's independence from the Netherlands, planned for 1996, was cancelled.

== Tugboat Off Aruba Coast ==
The route taken by a strange tugboat that was intercepted off the coast of Aruba and found to have two tons of cocaine on board provides information regarding smuggling techniques and the present position of the Caribbean island in the drug trade. According to El Pitazo, the tugboat was halted on October 13 in the territorial seas of Aruba, one of the Dutch Antilles' islands. The five-person crew, all Venezuelans, were detained and the boat was confiscated after 2.2 tons of cocaine were discovered during an Aruban government check of the vessel. Members of the Colombian navy have scoured the boat, which left from Cartagena, with drug-sniffing dogs. Authorities claimed that the cocaine was likely brought aboard the boat in open waters and that the boat eventually vanished from radar. A cocaine smuggling boat has been discovered in Aruba's territorial seas before this year. Off the island's northern shore, officials detained a suspicious watercraft in August. About 500 kilograms of cocaine were inside. https://insightcrime.org/news/brief/tugboat-off-aruba-coast-hides-more-than-just-cocaine/

== Decline ==
While drug trafficking through Aruba used to be a major issue, it is much less so today. Aruba was removed from the US State Department's list of major drug producing and transit countries in 1999. The reason for this decline is unclear. Case Study

== See also ==
- Designer drug
- Drug liberalization
- Drug policy of the Netherlands
- Legality of cannabis by country
- Minors and the legality of cannabis
