= Fredis Refunjol =

Aruban politician

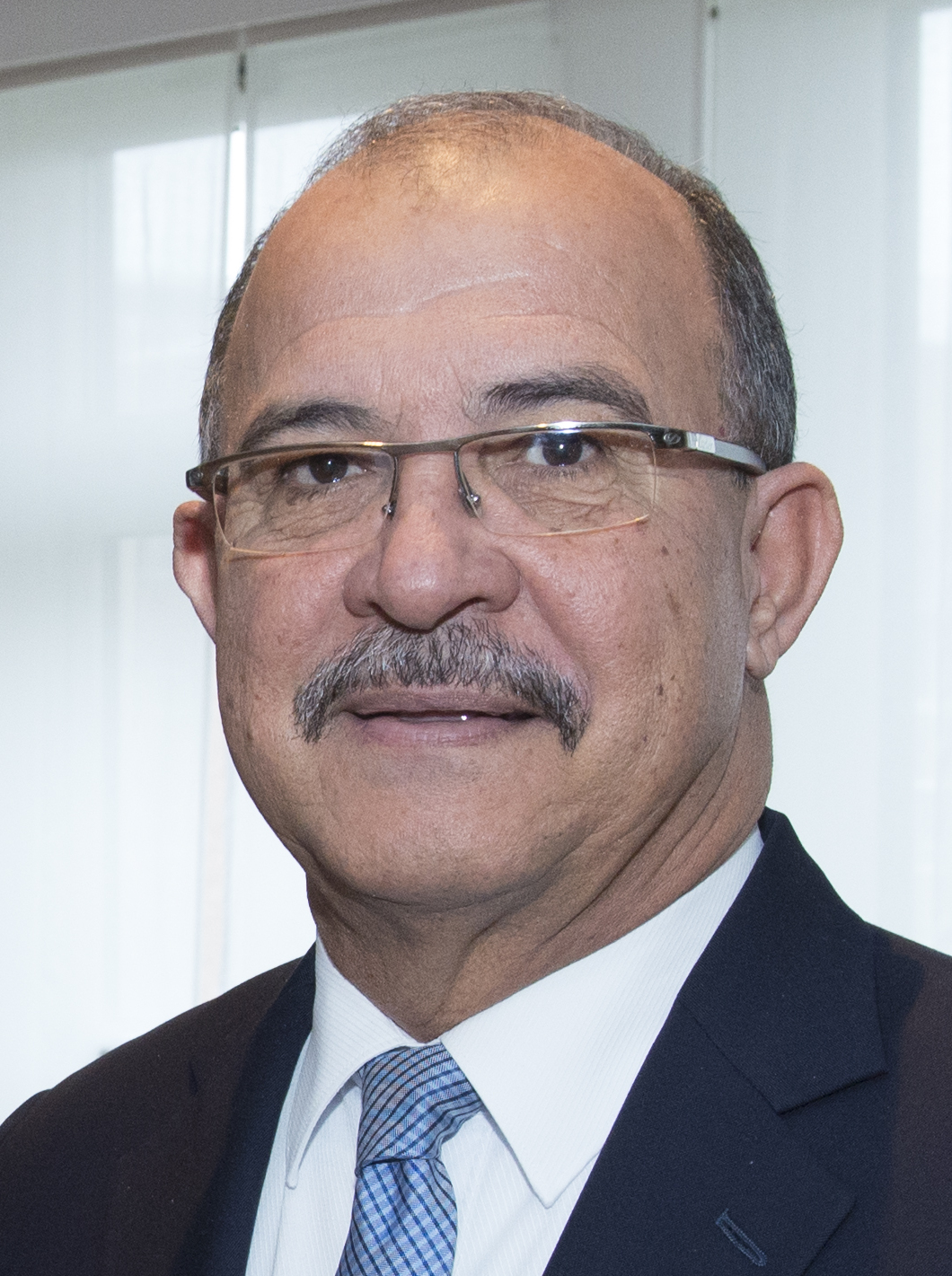

3rd Governor of Aruba
- In office 11 August 2004 – 31 December 2016
- Monarchs: Beatrix; Willem-Alexander
- Prime Minister: Nelson Oduber; Mike Eman
- Preceded by: Olindo Koolman
- Succeeded by: Alfonso Boekhoudt

Minister of Education & Administrative Affairs
- In office 3 October 2001 – 11 August 2004
- Succeeded by: Frido Croes

Minister of Welfare
- In office 12 January 1986 – 7 November 1989

Member of Parliament
- In office 12 January 1986 – 7 November 1989
- In office 29 July 1994 – 3 October 2001

Personal details
- Born: Fredis Jose Refunjol; 19 December 1950 (age 75) Aruba, Netherlands Antilles
- Party: People's Electoral Movement (1983–2004)
- Spouse: Clarette Lopez
- Children: 3

Fredis Jose Refunjol (born 19 December 1950) is a retired Aruban politician who served as the third governor of Aruba from 2004 to 2016. Originally a teacher, he has served as a government official for the past twenty years, starting as a member of the Parliament of Aruba.

== Early life ==
Fredis Jose Refunjol was born in Aruba, Netherlands Antilles, on 19 December 1950.

Refunjol obtained his Junior High School (mulo) diploma in 1968 and his college (havo) diploma in 1970. Three years later, in 1973, he graduated from the Aruba Teacher-Training Academy and was certified as a teacher.

Upon graduation, he secured employment at the Heilige Hart College in Savaneta as a teacher. He taught there for eight years before becoming principal in 1981.

== Career ==
Refunjol joined the People's Electoral Movement (MEP) in 1983. The next year he became the party's vice president, holding that position until 1987, when he was named as the party Secretary General (effective 1988).

While serving as party vice president, he stood as a candidate in Aruba's first parliamentary elections in 1986, where he was elected to the Parliament of Aruba.

In 1989, he was the informateur during both the formation of the first cabinet of Prime Minister Oduber (Oduber I) and that of the second cabinet (Oduber II) formed in 1993. After the first cabinet was formed, he was named Minister of Welfare, serving until the MEP lost the 1994 Aruban general election.

Following his party's defeat in the 1994 election, Refunjol became a member of the Parliament of Aruba once more.

After seven years in the opposition, the MEP won the 2001 general election, after which Refunjol served as formateur for the third Oduber cabinet (Oduber III), and consequently became its Minister of Education and Administrative Affairs, in addition to becoming Vice Prime Minister.

In 2004, the term of Governor Olindo Koolman expired; restricted by term limits, he was not reappointed by the Queen. Due to the extent of his government experience, Refunjol was appointed by royal decree as Koolman's successor, assuming the office of governor on 1 May 2004. During his nomination proceedings, he enjoyed the unanimous support of the parliament for his candidacy. As a result of the apolitical nature of his office, he was required to tender his resignation from both the parliament and his party, immediately upon taking office and was barred from politics until his service as governor was complete.

== Awards ==
On 8 December 2016, Refunjol was promoted to Commander in the Order of Orange-Nassau.

== Personal life ==
He is married to Clarette Maria de Lourdes Refunjol-Lopez. Together they have two daughters (Cheryl and Zanette) and one son (Fredis).

== See also ==
- list of governors of Aruba

Government offices
| Preceded by Olindo Koolman | Governor of Aruba; 2004–2016 | Succeeded by Alfonso Boekhoudt |
