= Carol Bruyning =

Aruban model

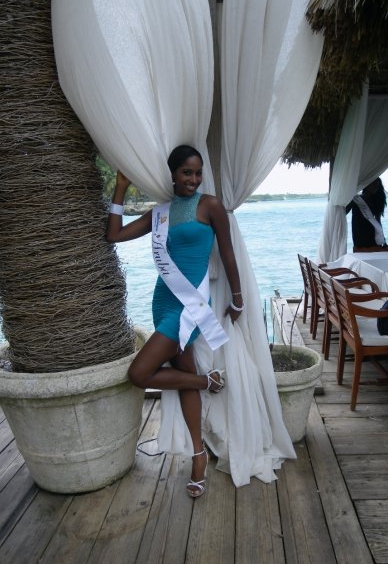
- Carol Bruyning
- Born: Carol A. Bruyning; January 8, 1984 (age 41)
- Height: 1.75 m (5 ft 9 in)
- Beauty pageant titleholder
- Title: Miss Aruba 2008 (top 5); Miss Ambar World 2009 (top 15); Miss Divi-Divi International 2009 (winner)
- Hair color: black
- Eye color: light brown

Carol Bruyning is a beauty queen from Aruba who won the 2009 Miss Divi-Divi International title.

== Biography ==
Bruyning finished top 5 in the 2008 Miss Aruba Pageant. Prior to that, she had completed her bachelor's degree in Business Economics at the University of Aruba and started work as an Accounting Coordinator. Bruyning later became a High School Economics teacher.

After the Miss Aruba 2008 Competition, Bruyning worked for Aruba's modeling agency Koma Models. She appeared in TV and magazine commercials.

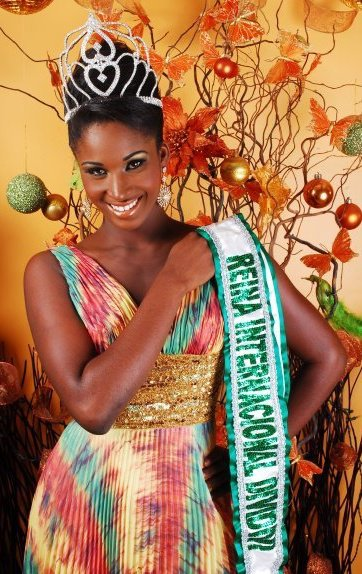
Carol Bruyning, Miss Divi-Divi International 2009

Bruyning was president of Kiwanis Circle K international of the University of Aruba and the Miss Aruba 2008 charity project Famia Planea (Family Planning). She founded the Fundashon Karanan Kontentu (Happy Faces Foundation).

Bruyning later represented Aruba in the Miss Ambar World 2009 (Miss Ambar Mundial) in the Dominican Republic. Of the 34 participants Bruyning made it into the top 15 finalists.

In October 2009 Bruyning represented Aruba in the Miss Divi-Divi International 2009 pageant (Reinado Internacional del Divi-Divi) in Ríohacha, Colombia where Carol became the first Miss Divi-Divi International.

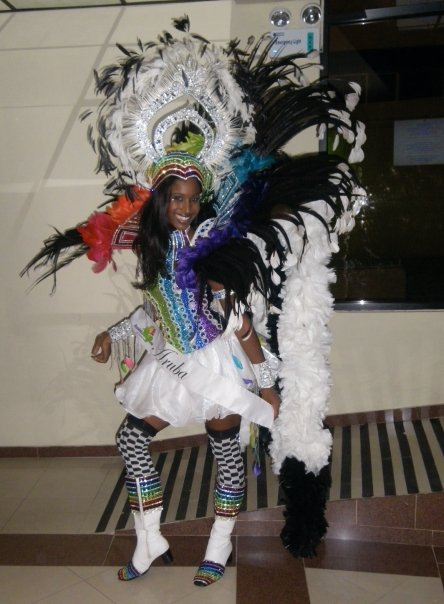
Carol Bruyning shows off her National Costume at Miss Ambar World 2009
