= Diario (Aruba) =

- Type: Daily newspaper
- Managing editor: Jossy Mansur
- Founded: 1980
- Language: Papiamento language
- Headquarters: Englandstreet 29, Oranjestad
- City: Oranjestad, Aruba
- Country: Aruba
- Website: www.diario.aw

Diario is a daily, family-owned newspaper written in the Papiamento language and published in Aruba. The managing editor is Jossy Mansur.
