= Henry Habibe =

Frederick Hendrik (Henry) Habibe (born 6 May 1940 in Aruba) is an Aruban poet, literary critic and literary man.

He published his poetry mainly in the period following the creation of his magazine Watapana (1968–1972). He writes most of his poems in the Papiamento language, occasionally in Spanish and Dutch.

In 1985 he received his PhD at the University of Leiden on the study El compromiso en la poesía afro-antillana de Cuba y Puerto Rico, that treated Nicolás Guillén and other poets as its main subject. He also published studies on the work of Pierre Lauffer, JS Corsen and Luis Daal. He wrote reviews for the Antillian newspapers: Amigoe di Curacao and Beurs- en Nieuwsberichten (1986–1997). Henry Habib is a member of the advisory board of the Werkgroep Caraïbische Letteren (Caribbean Study group of Arts) of the Maatschappij der Nederlandse Letterkunde (Society of Dutch Literature) in Leiden.

== Publications ==
- Aurora (1968), poetry
- Keresentenchi (1980), poetry
- El compromiso en la poesía afro-antillana de Cuba y Puerto Rico (1985), thesis
- Yiu di tera (1985), poetry
- Un herida bida; Een verkenning van het poëtisch oeuvre van Pierre Lauffer (Un herida bida; An exploration of the poetry of Pierre Lauffer) (1994), a study
- Bombai! (1995), translation from Dutch to Papiamentu of Els Pelgroms Bombaaj
- De spirituele opgang van een Curaçaose dichter; Een verkenning van het poëtisch oeuvre van Luis Daal (1997) (The spiritual ascent of a Curacoan poet; An exploration of the poetry of Luis Daal), a study
- Honderd jaar Atardi; Een verkenning van het poëtisch oeuvre van J.S. Corsen (2006), (One hundred years Atardi; An exploration of the poetry of J.S. Corsen), a study
- Kantika pa bientu/Liederen voor de wind (2006), (An anthology translated into Dutch of the work of Pierre Lauffer, along with Igma van Putte-de Windt)
- Vulkanisch samenzijn (2008), poetry

== Sources ==
- dbnl authors
- schrijversinfo
