= Aruban Liberal Organization =

Political party

The Aruban Liberal Organization (Organisacion Liberal Arubiano, OLA) is a liberal political party in Aruba. At the 2001 Aruban general election, the party won 5.7% of popular votes and one out of 21 seats. On 23 September 2005, the party won only 4% of the popular vote and lost its seat.

== History ==
It was founded in late 1991 by Glenbert Croes, who, earlier that year, had turned his back on the MEP after it refused to admit him as a party member.

== See also ==
- Liberalism
- Liberalism worldwide
- List of liberal parties
