= 1977 Aruban independence referendum =

25 March 1977

Results
Choice	Votes	%
Independence	21,418	95.18%
Remain in the Netherlands Antilles	1,085	4.82%
Valid votes	22,503	85.98%
Invalid or blank votes	3,669	14.02%
Total votes	26,172	100.00%
Registered voters/turnout	37,346	70.08%

An independence referendum was held in Aruba on 25 March 1977. In 1976 the Estates had approved a referendum on the island's status. Voters were given the choice of independence or remaining in the Netherlands Antilles, with over 95% voting in favour of the former. In 1983 the Treaty of The Hague planned independence for Aruba by 1996, and the island seceded from the Netherlands Antilles in 1986. However, in 1994 the plan for full independence was scrapped.

== Results ==
Choice	Votes	%
Independence	21,418	95.17
Remaining in the Netherlands Antilles	1,085	4.83
Invalid/blank votes	3,669	–
Total	26,172	100
Registered voters/turnout	37,346	70.08
Source: Direct Democracy
