= Xiomara Maduro =

Aruban politician

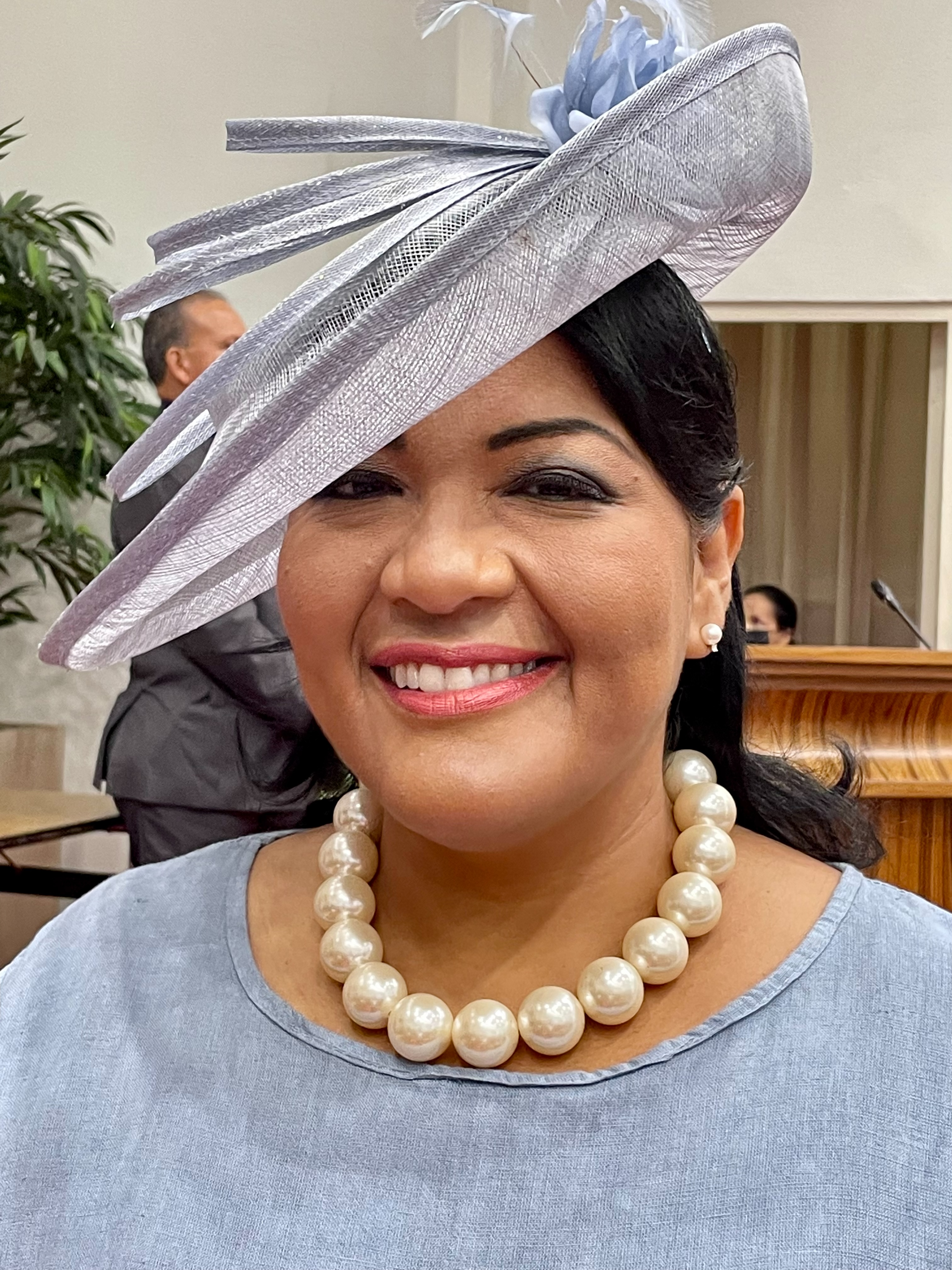

Minister of Finance & Culture
- Incumbent
- Assumed office 2017

Personal details
- Born: Xiomara Jeanira Maduro; 24 December 1974 (age 51) Aruba
- Party: People's Electoral Movement (MEP)
- Occupation: economist, politician

Xiomara Jeanira Maduro (born 24 December 1974) is a Dutch politician from Aruba, who is the Minister of Finance and Culture in Aruba.

== Biography ==
In 1995, Maduro obtained her bachelor's degree in Economics at the HAN University of Applied Sciences in Nijmegen. She then obtained her master's degree in Law with a specialisation in administrative law from the University of Groningen. In 2003, she returned to Aruba, and started to work for the Financial Intelligence Unit.

Maduro entered politics as an MP in 2009, and was appointed to the cabinet of Evelyn Wever-Croes in 2017. Maduro's challenge as finance minister has been to set budgetary targets that will begin to tackle the national debt owed to the Netherlands. From 2017-18 there was growth in the GDP of Aruba, but its economic growth relies heavily on the tourism industry - which accounts for 92% of its GDP.

In 2016, in response to a ban of plastic bags by the government, Maduro called for further increases to Aruba's environmental initiatives. She cited the fact that no environmental protection law had yet been passed in the territory.
