= Governor of Aruba =

Dutch representative

Governor's standard

The governor of Aruba (Papiamento: Gobernador di Aruba; Dutch: Gouverneur van Aruba) is the representative on Aruba of the Dutch monarch. The governor's duties are twofold; he represents and guards the general interests of the Kingdom of the Netherlands and is head of the Aruban government. He is accountable to the government of the kingdom. As the head of the Aruban government, the governor is inviolable; the ministers are responsible. The governor does not have political responsibilities and is not part of the Aruban cabinet. During the formation of a cabinet, the governor plays an important role. The governor is appointed by the monarch for a period of six years. This period can be prolonged for one more term of six years. The governor is supported and advised by the Council of Advice (Raad van Advies), consisting of at least five members, appointed by the governor, advising him on the drafts of state ordinances, state decrees, kingdom acts and general administrative orders.

== List of governors ==
On 1 January 1986 Aruba attained its status aparte. Before this date the governor of the Netherlands Antilles was represented on Aruba by a lieutenant-governor (gezaghebber).

#	Name (Birth–Death)	Took office	Left office	No
1	Felipe Tromp (1917–1995)	1 January 1986	28 January 1992	27 September 1985, No.16
2	Olindo Koolman (1942–)	29 January 1992	1 May 2004	28 January 1992, No. 92.000904
3	Fredis Refunjol (1950–)	1 May 2004	31 December 2016	4 May 2004, No. 04.001780
4	Alfonso Boekhoudt (1965–)	1 January 2017		
