= Henny Eman =

Aruban politician (1948–2025)

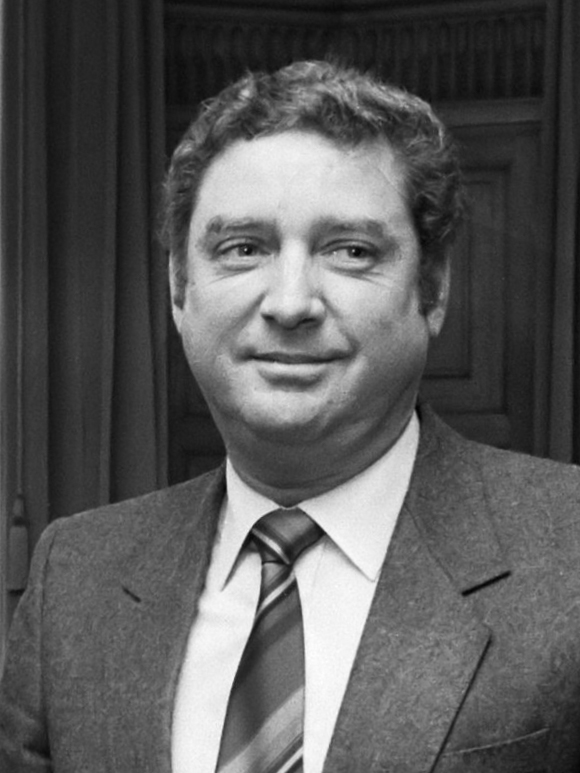
- Henny Eman in 1986

1st Prime Minister of Aruba
- In office 1 January 1986 – 9 February 1989
- Preceded by: Office created
- Succeeded by: Nelson Oduber
- In office 29 July 1994 – 30 October 2001
- Preceded by: Nelson Oduber
- Succeeded by: Nelson Oduber

Personal details
- Born: Jan Hendrik Albert Eman; 20 March 1948 Aruba
- Died: 6 January 2025 (aged 76)
- Party: Arubaanse Volkspartij/ Partido di Pueblo Arubano

Jan Hendrik Albert "Henny" Eman (20 March 1948 – 6 January 2025) was an Aruban politician who served as the 1st Prime Minister of Aruba from 1986 to 1989 and again from 1994 to 2001.

== Introduction ==
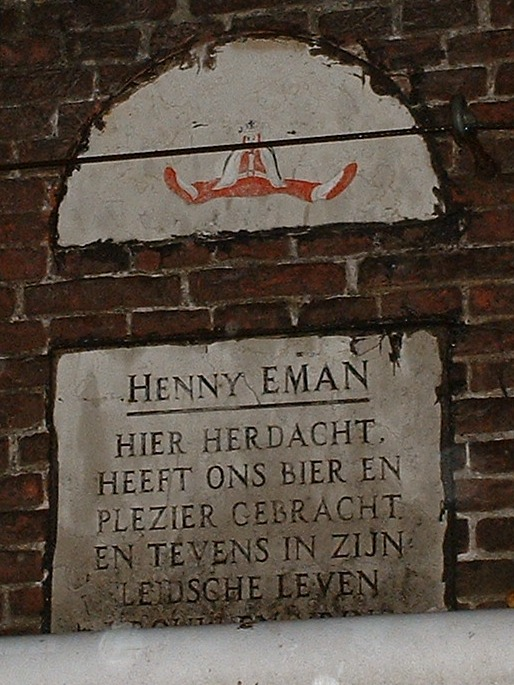
Memorial stone at Leiden Cafe "Het Keizertje"

Jan Hendrik Albert Eman, simply known as Henny, was born in Aruba on 20 March 1948. His grandfather (also known as Henny Eman) founded the Christian Democratic Party Aruban People's Party (AVP) and is considered pioneer of Aruba's political Status aparte from the Netherlands Antilles.

His mother was Jewish and his father was Protestant. His father, Albert Eman, better known as Shon A Eman, carried on the AVP's leadership banner. Shon A dedicated his life to Aruba's quest for a "Separate Status within the Kingdom" as presented to Holland during the Round Table Conference of the Kingdom of the Netherlands in 1948 at The Hague (Henny was born two days later).

Henny grew up in a political environment. At an early age he went to the Netherlands. As a high school graduate, he became a student at the Leiden University's Law School. Upon the unexpected early death of his father, Henny Eman, was forced to undertake some business activities in Leiden in addition to his studies.

== Resurgence ==
By 1977 the AVP was confronted with serious opposition and was struggling for survival with only one seat in the Insular Parliament. Eman interrupted his studies to tend a helping hand to the party. His relatively brief stay in Aruba became decisive for his future career: politics. In 1978 he obtained his law degree. He presented his thesis dealing with the historical and judicial aspects of Aruba's Status aparte.

Three months before the 1979 elections; Eman arrived in Aruba. He became the leader of the only political party still holding on to Status Aparte. The AVP was reinforced with young and capable people running for office as did Eman. The 1979 elections outcome turned the tide in Eman's favor and went on to obtain four seats in Parliament.

After an absence of six years the AVP made its re-entrance into Federal Parliament during 1979. Henny Eman became a well-respected member of the Antillean Parliament as well as the Insular Parliament of Aruba. In 1986 he became the first Prime Minister of Aruba; then besieged by the crisis resulting from LAGO's departure. The Eman administration executed a well-prepared economic rescue plan and within a couple of years Aruba's economy swiftly recovered.

The parties lose in the 1989 elections made Eman taking the role in the form of Opposition Leader in Parliament.

Eman died on 6 January 2025, at the age of 76.

== Honours ==
- Knight - Order of Francisco de Miranda (Venezuela)
- Knight - Order of the Liberator (Venezuela)
- Knight - Order of the Netherlands Lion (Netherlands)
