= Nelson Oduber =

Aruban politician (born 1947)

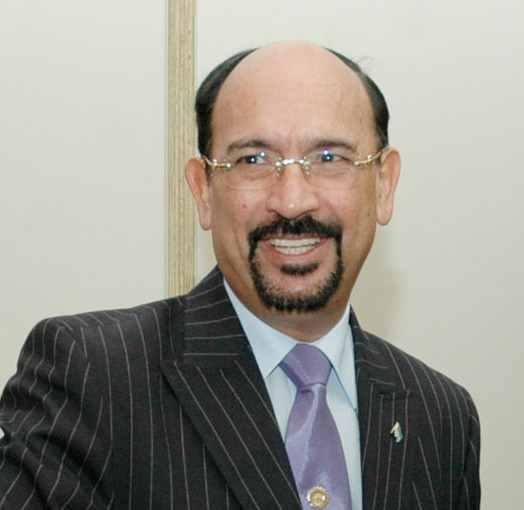

2nd Prime Minister of Aruba
- In office 30 October 2001 – 30 October 2009
- Monarch: Beatrix
- Preceded by: Henny Eman
- Succeeded by: Mike Eman
- In office 9 February 1989 – 29 July 1994
- Monarch: Beatrix
- Preceded by: Henny Eman
- Succeeded by: Henny Eman

Personal details
- Born: 7 February 1947 (age 79) Oranjestad, Aruba
- Party: People's Electoral Movement
- Spouse: Glenda Croes
- Children: 3 (including Dangui)

Nelson Orlando Oduber (born 7 February 1947) is an Aruban former politician who served as the 2nd Prime Minister of Aruba from 1989 to 1994 and again from 2001 to 2009.

== Early life ==
Oduber was born on 7 February 1947, at the Lago Hospital in San Nicolaas, Aruba to Urbano Oduber and Carmen Felepina Croes. He was raised in a Catholic household and had a big family, consisting of 9 sons and 4 sisters. They lived in the Siribana neighborhood in a regular well mannered home. His father worked for Lago Oil and Transport Company and his mother took care of the children. Tragedy struck the family of 15 when his father, who was working for W.E.B at the time, was struck by a high voltage of electricity and received severe burns to the skin, and died on 14 January 1964, leaving behind his wife and 13 children. Oduber was 16 years of age at the time of his father's death.

After attending St Joseph Primary school, Oduber attended St Anthony secondary school. He was a disciplined student and always finished his work on time. He graduated M.U.L.O at St. Anthony in 1965. After finishing M.U.L.O, Oduber tried to get a scholarship so he could study abroad, but ultimately did not get it. After being disappointed about the scholarship, he sparked the interest of Dr. Gustavo Oduber, who at the time was Deputy of the insular territory of Aruba and offered Oduber a job as Island Receiver. In 1967, Oduber got the opportunity to move to the Netherlands on a study assignment and lived in Tilburg. In 1970 he finished Public administration at Brabantian Administrative Academy in Tilburg and in 1972 he finished his studies in Constitutional Science. In 1973, he graduated from Utrecht University with a master's degree in general education.

== Career ==
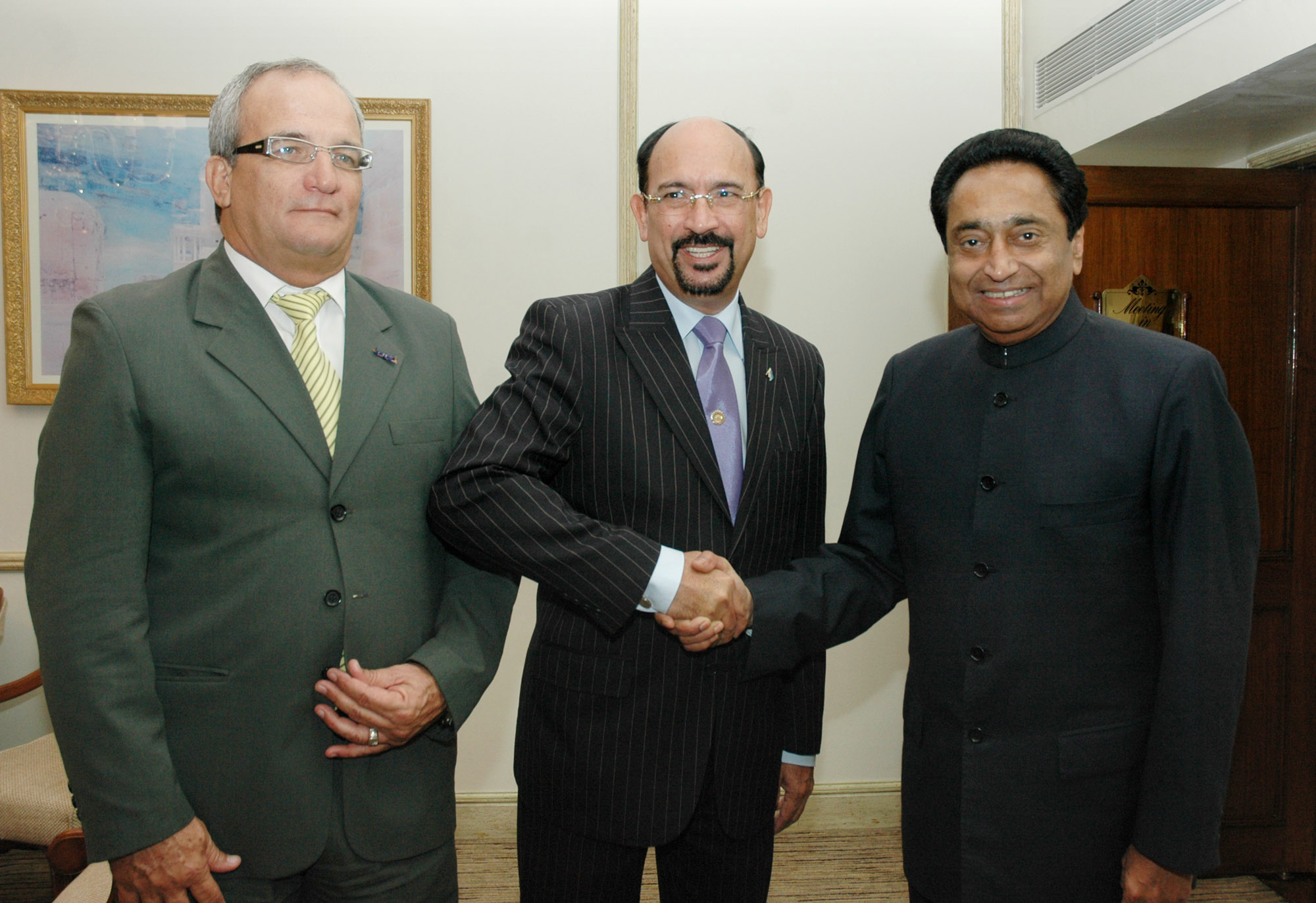
Nelson Oduber (center) meeting with Shri Kamal Nath in New Delhi, 11 December 2007.

following the successful completion of his studies abroad, Oduber resumed his job as a civil servant in at the Department of Legal Affairs, Oduber entered politics in 1989 joining the People's Electoral Movement and went on to win the 1989 Aruban general election. following the forming on the government, Oduber became Aruba's 2nd prime minister. Oduber's tenure as prime minister was plagued with his decision to cancel Aruba's exit from the Kingdom of the Netherlands, which subsequently led to his party's defeat in the 1994 Aruban general election. following his defeat, Oduber served as Leader of the Opposition within the Parliament of Aruba. following the 2001 Aruban general election Oduber's party gained back its majority in parliament and subsequently formed a new government. Oduber served as prime minister until his party's defeat in the 2009 Aruban general election, after which he retired from politics.

== Honours ==
- Knight - Order of the Netherlands Lion (Netherlands)

== Personal life ==
Oduber is married to Glenda Croes and has three children.

== See also ==
- People's Electoral Movement (Aruba)
- List of prime ministers of Aruba
