= Status aparte =

1986–2010 political status of Aruba

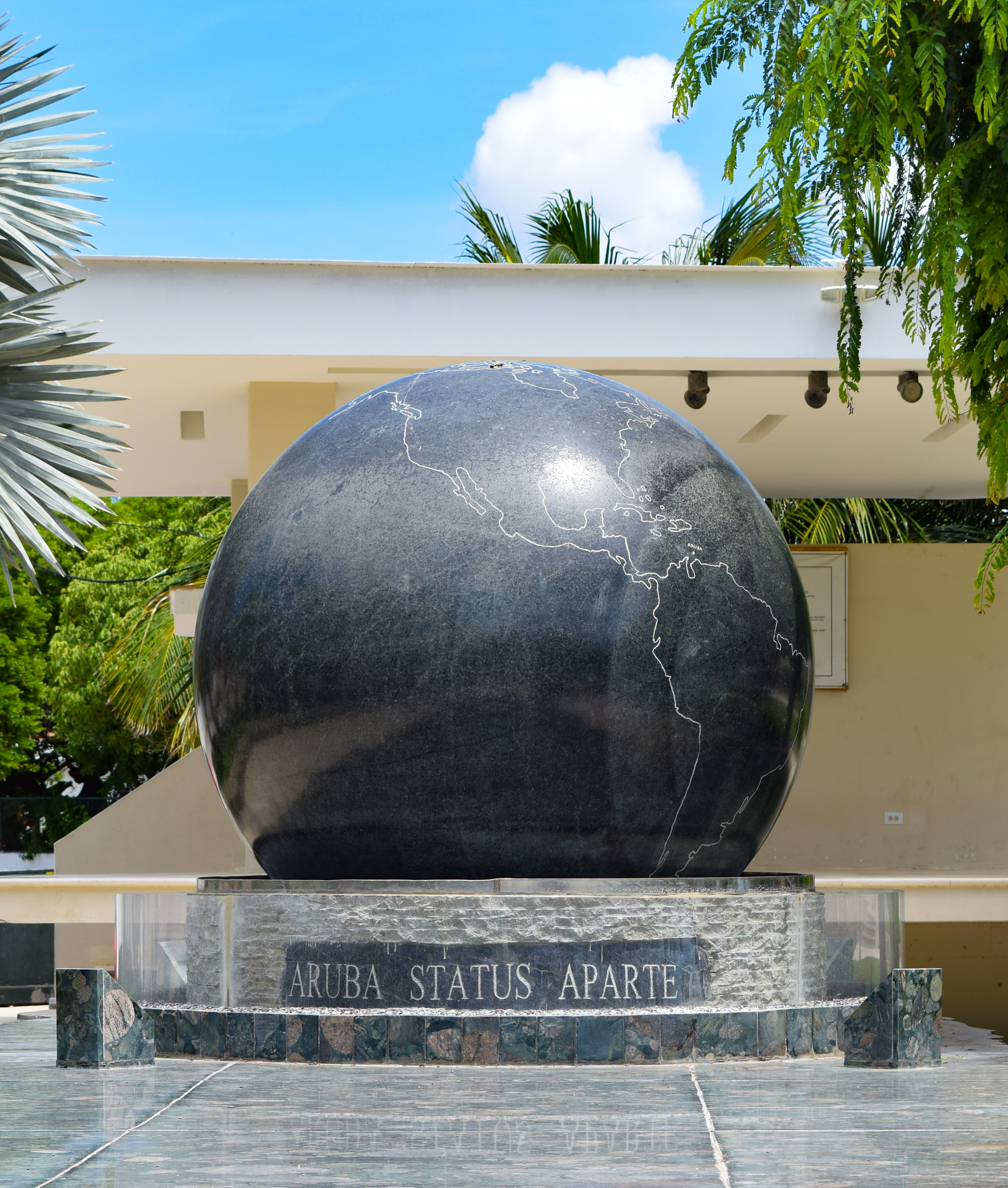
Status Aparte Monument in Oranjestad, Aruba

Status aparte (Latin for "separate state") refers to the special status of Aruba between 1986 and 2010 as a constituent country within the Kingdom of the Netherlands, separate from the Netherlands Antilles to which it belonged until 1986. With the dissolution of the Netherlands Antilles in October 2010, the term status aparte was no longer used, as the status of Aruba was no longer separate, but rather the norm for all countries within the Kingdom.

== History ==
Since the 1930s, the call for a greater degree of independence from Curaçao has been heard in Aruba. It wasn't until the 1970s that the call became more apparent with Betico Croes starting a political party (MEP) and becoming the leader of the Status Aparte movement. The goal was for Aruba to take a separate status in the Kingdom, apart from the Netherlands Antilles and, after the independence of Suriname in 1975, to become the third constituent country in the Kingdom. After years of negotiations, Croes managed to enforce the secession of Aruba from the Netherlands Antilles, as of 1 January 1986, on the condition however that Aruba would become independent ten years later, in 1996. Although that is not what the MEP wanted, they agreed. The representatives of Curaçao also objected, stating Aruban independence should come from a referendum of the whole of the Netherlands Antilles, the Aruban representatives also submitted a referendum request for just Aruba to the States General of the Netherlands, which was refused. However, the Netherlands later recognised that Aruba did not want independence and only wanted to be separate from the Netherlands Antilles within the Kingdom.

In 1990 Aruba and the Netherlands decided to reverse the original condition of independence and keep Aruba in the Kingdom. Negotiations were finalized in 1994. It was agreed to indefinitely postpone the date of Aruban independence, before the date was removed completely from statute in 1995.

After Curaçao and Sint Maarten got a similar status as Aruba with the dissolution of the Netherlands Antilles in 2010, the status aparte of Aruba as a result practically ceased to exist.

== See also ==
- Dissolution of the Netherlands Antilles
