= 1945 Curaçao general election =

General elections were held in the Territory of Curaçao on 5 November 1945. Ten of the fifteen seats in the Estates of Curaçao were elected, with the remaining five appointed by governor P.A. Kasteel. The ten elected seats consisted of five for Curaçao, three for Aruba, one for Bonaire and one for the SSS Islands

From a population of 127,866 (December 1944) only 6,093 men, about 5% of the population, were entitled to vote in the elections. They was the last parliamentary elections in Curaçao before the introduction of universal suffrage.

== Results ==
Party	Island	Votes	%	Seats
Democratic Party	Curaçao	2,122	39.72	3
Catholic Party	Curaçao	1,208	22.61	2
Eman List	Aruba	1,167	21.85	2
Catholic Union	Aruba	519	9.72	1
Curaçaoan Protestant Party	Curaçao	190	3.56	0
Gerharts List	Bonaire	44	0.82	1
Protestant List	Aruba	42	0.79	0
Catholic Party	Bonaire	38	0.71	0
Marchena List	Bonaire	12	0.22	0
Plantz List	SSS islands			1
Appointed members				5
Total		5,342	100.00	15
Registered voters/turnout		6,103	–	

=== Curaçao ===
Population: 78,587 (31 December 1944)
Entitled to vote: 4,095
Valid votes: 3,520
Invalid votes: 45
Seats: 5
Average valid votes per seat: 704

#	Candidate	Total per list	Votes	Result
Democratic Party (DP)
1	E. Jonckheer	2,122	1,262	Elected
2	W.W. de Regt	2,122	66	Elected
3	P.H. Maal	2,122	41	-
4	C.H.W. Hueck	2,122	4	-
5	S.W. van der Meer	2,122	337	-
6	R.J. Wix	2,122	356	Elected
7	C.D. Kroon	2,122	2	-
8	J. Capriles	2,122	47	-
9	G.E. Rosario	2,122	7	-
Catholic Party
1	M.F. da Costa Gomez	1,208	1,063	Elected
2	J.H. Sprockel	1,208	28	Elected
3	E.A. Römer	1,208	4	-
4	C.B. Debrot	1,208	5	-
5	D.L. Capriles	1,208	3	-
6	J.H.E. Lamp	1,208	1	-
7	I.A.A. Kramers	1,208	10	-
8	R.H.C. van Haaren	1,208	94	-
Curaçaoan Protestant Party
1	H. Tiesma	190	107	-
2	F. Visser	190	15	-
3	W.J. Goslinga	190	39	-
4	F. Vreugdenhil	190	2	-
5	D. Colijn	190	21	-
6	H.J. Rijsdijk	190	6	-

Wix received enough preferential votes to get elected. With 2,122 votes 3 seats were obtained by the DP; 707 votes per seat. Wix had more than 50% of 707 votes.

W.W. de Regt was succeeded by P.H. Maal.

=== Aruba ===
Population: 39,318 (31 December 1944)
Entitled to vote: 1,906
Valid votes: 1,728
Seats: 3
Average valid votes per seat: 576

#	Candidate	Total per list	Votes	Result
Protestant List
1	H. Tiesma	42	12	-
2	F. Visser	42	1	-
3	W.J. Goslinga	42	3	-
4	F. Vreugdenhil	42	0	-
5	D. Colijn	42	0	-
6	H.J. Rijsdijk	42	0	-
7	J. Pauw	42	19	-
8	J.H. Finck	42	7	-
Eman List
1	J.H.A. Eman	1,167	1,141	Elected
2	F.J.Q. Kwartsz	1,167	8	Elected
3	J.E. Irausquin	1,167	18	-
Catholic Union
1	J.R. Arends	519	478	Elected
2	L.A.C. Laclé	519	15	-
3	C.L. Juliao	519	2	-
4	E.A. de Cuba	519	8	-
5	C. Maduro	519	10	-
6	C.W. Wever	519	6	-

=== Bonaire ===
Population: 5,798 (31 December 1944)
Entitled to vote: 102
Valid votes: 94
Seats: 1

Candidate	Total per list	Votes	Result
Marchena List
R.Th.M. Marchena	12	12	-
Gerharts List
L.D. Gerharts	44	44	Elected
Catholic Party
A. Booi	38	38	-
C.B. Debrot	38	0	-

=== SSS Islands ===
Entitled to vote: 148 (Sint Maarten: 60, Sint Eustatius: 45, Saba: 43)
Seats: 1

W.R. Plantz was the only candidate so the seat for the SSS Islands went automatically to him.

=== Appointed by the governor ===
Gerharts was not on time to hand over his letter of credence and therefore he lost his seat. The governor decided to use one of the five seats he could appoint for Gerharts, so he still became a member of the Estates of Curaçao. The other four people who were appointed by the governor were A.W.J.M. Desertine, V.E. Henriquez, C.W.J. Jonckheer and E. Cohen Henriquez.

== Aftermath ==
The governor decided that Desertine was the speaker of the parliament and Plantz the deputy speaker.

The new session of the Estates started on the first Tuesday of April 1946. Because of the issue with the letter of credence of Gerharts the number of members of the Estates of Curaçao was not 15 but 14.
