= 1950 Netherlands Antilles general election =

General elections were held in the Netherlands Antilles on 21 December 1950. These snap elections were necessary because in the 'Interimregeling' the number of seats and the divisions of the seats in the Estates of the Netherlands Antilles was changed.

The 22 seats in the Estates of the Netherlands Antilles consisted of twelve for Curaçao, eight for Aruba, one for Bonaire and one for the SSS Islands. At the previous elections (1949) the 21 seats consisted of eight for Curaçao, eight for Aruba, two for Bonaire and one for each of the three SSS Islands.

== Results ==
Party	Island	Votes	%	Seats
National People's Party	Curaçao	13,444	28.37	5
Democratic Party	Curaçao	11,269	23.78	4
Catholic People's Party	Curaçao	5,440	11.48	2
Aruban People's Party	Aruba	4,474	9.44	4
Aruban Patriotic Party	Aruba	3,063	6.46	2
Curaçaoan Independent Party	Curaçao	2,270	4.79	1
Aruban National Union I	Aruba	2,070	4.37	1
Aruba Independence Party	Aruba	1,406	2.97	1
Partido Boneriano Uni	Bonaire	1,218	2.57	1
Aruban National Union II	Aruba	976	2.06	0
Partido Progresista Boneriano	Bonaire	750	1.58	0
List Voges	SSS Islands	749	1.58	1
List Cruger	SSS Islands	134	0.28	0
Democratic Party	SSS Islands	122	0.26	0
Total		47,385	100.00	22
Registered voters/turnout		57,556	–	

=== Curaçao ===
Population: 98,161 (31 December 1949)
Entitled to vote: 39,768
Valid votes: 32,423
Seats: 12
Average valid votes per seat: 2,702

#	Candidate	Total per list	Votes	Result
National People's Party (NVP)
1	M.F. da Costa Gomez	13,444	13,011	Elected
2	H.G.M. Pieters Kwiers	13,444	?	Elected
3	Ph. Cohen Henriquez	13,444	?	Elected
4	Mrs. A.A. de Lannoy-Elisabeth	13,444	?	Elected
5	W.J. Goslinga	13,444	27	Elected
6	L.A.G.O. Lashley	13,444	71	-
7	N. Debrot	13,444	?	-
8	E.C.B. Bartels Daal	13,444	?	-
9	E.J. Broos	13,444	?	-
10	Ph.A. de Jongh	13,444	?	-
11	G.F.E. Cruger	13,444	?	-
12	J. van Toorn	13,444	9	-
13	E.M. Newton	13,444	?	-
14	H.M. Henriquez	13,444	?	-
15	A.E. Panneflek	13,444	?	-
16	J.M.F. Pieters	13,444	?	-
17	B.Ph. Römer	13,444	?	-
Democratic Party (DP)
1	E. Jonckheer	11,269	8,855	Elected
2	C.D. Kroon	11,269	?	Elected
3	S.W. van der Meer	11,269	71	Elected
4	R.J. Isa	11,269	?	-
5	C.H.W. Hueck	11,269	?	-
6	H.L. Braam	11,269	1,908	Elected
7	Mrs. L.C. van der Linde-Helmijr	11,269	?	-
8	J.B. Rosario	11,269	?	-
9	F.J. Pijpers	11,269	?	-
10	O.R.A. Beaujon	11,269	?	-
11	R. Martinez	11,269	?	-
12	A.C. da Costa Gomez	11,269	?	-
13	Mrs C.C. Kroon-van Uyten	11,269	?	-
14	J.G. Felix	11,269	?	-
15	C.D. Boekhoudt	11,269	?	-
16	C.C. Peterson	11,269	?	-
17	P.H. Maal	11,269	?	-
Catholic People's Party (KVP)
1	I.C. Debrot	5,440	5,038	Elected
2	J.H. Sprockel	5,440	?	Elected
3	A.M. Smit	5,440	?	-
4	E.J. Morkos	5,440	?	-
5	H.Th.B. Willers	5,440	?	-
6	Miss A.M.R. Rigaud	5,440	?	-
7	G.E.A. Booi	5,440	?	-
8	W.A. Palm	5,440	?	-
9	M.R.W.B. Berkenveld	5,440	?	-
10	H.M. van Delden	5,440	?	-
11	R.M. Panneflek	5,440	?	-
12	J.L. Martina	5,440	?	-
Curaçaoan Independent Party (COP)
1	P. van der Hoeven	2,270	1,658	Elected
2	Ph.J. Evertsz	2,270	?	-
3	N.M. Chumaceiro	2,270	?	-
4	A. de Haan	2,270	?	-
5	W. Meijer	2,270	?	-
6	E.R. Lansberg	2,270	?	-
7	M. Segaar	2,270	?	-
8	D. Ensing	2,270	?	-
9	A.N.Th. van Meeteren	2,270	?	-

=== Aruba ===
Population: 53,574 (31 December 1949)
Entitled to vote: 14,521
Valid votes: 11,991
Seats: 8
Average valid votes per seat: 1,498 7/8

#	Candidate	Total per list	Votes	Result
Aruban People's Party (AVP)
1	J.H.A. Eman	4,474	3,935	Elected
2	J. Geerman	4,474	124	Elected
3	M.E. de Cuba	4,474	42	Elected
4	L. Laclé	4,474	34	Elected
5	A.J. Flanegin	4,474	18	-
6	J. Pauw	4,474	71	-
7	W.H. de la Fuente	4,474	128	-
8	J.C. Lejuez	4,474	44	-
9	H.T. Erasmus	4,474	4	-
10	G. Croes	4,474	4	-
11	H.P. Oduber	4,474	8	-
12	F.M. Zeppenfeldt	4,474	62	-
Aruban Patriotic Party
1	P. Croes	3,063	1,014	Elected
2	J.E. Irausquin	3,063	1,103	Elected
3	A. Thijssen	3,063	26	-
4	F. Kelly	3,063	22	-
5	J. Maduro	3,063	50	-
6	F.V. Laclé	3,063	43	-
7	E.R. Finck	3,063	668	-
8	E. Hassel	3,063	98	-
9	O. Croes	3,063	1	-
10	J.R.L. Beauion	3,063	10	-
11	B. Luydens	3,063	2	-
12	C. Angela	3,063	13	-
13	S.J. Croes	3,063	13	-
UNA I
1	F.B. Tromp	2,070	1,740	Elected
2	G. Amelink	2,070	167	-
3	J.V. de Cuba	2,070	47	-
4	H.P.E. Écury	2,070	17	-
5	Th. Hassell	2,070	26	-
6	B.F. Dirksz	2,070	5	-
7	Miss A. Aletrino	2,070	8	-
8	S. Luydens	2,070	1	-
9	Th.J. Luydens	2,070	5	-
10	M.J. Croes	2,070	4	-
11	F.J. Tromp	2,070	17	-
12	C. Luydens	2,070	33	-
Aruba Independence Party
1	D.A. Vlaun	1,406	826	Elected
2	J.R.A. Simoons	1,406	214	-
3	J.A.F. Spit	1,406	29	-
4	A.P. van Vuurden	1,406	25	-
5	W. Nisbet	1,406	61	-
6	W.C. Anslijn	1,406	61	-
7	W.T.H. Hilman	1,406	58	-
8	L.A.G.O. Lashley	1,406	5	-
9	E. Lopez Henriquez	1,406	32	-
10	C.E. Hassel	1,406	48	-
11	A.W.A. Stede	1,406	7	-
12	H.C. Wathey	1,406	9	-
13	Ch.C.W. Voges	1,406	31	-
UNA II
1	A. Werleman	978	801	-
2	A.F. Dussenbroek	978	?	-
3	G.J. Schouten	978	?	-
4	L. Wernet	978	?	-
5	C. Maduro	978	?	-
6	L. Wever	978	?	-
7	P. Maduro	978	?	-
8	M.E. de Kort	978	?	-
9	C.H.P. Schwengle	978	?	-
10	R.E. Frank	978	?	-
11	Th.H. Newton	978	?	-
12	F. Luydens	978	?	-
13	E.R. Arends	978	?	-

=== Bonaire ===
Population: 5,011 (31 December 1949)
Entitled to vote: 2,262
Valid votes: 1,968
Seats: 1

#	Candidate	Total per list	Votes	Result
Partido Boneriano Uni
1	L.D. Gerharts	1,218	?	Elected
2	J.A. Abraham	1,218	?	-
3	G.E.A. Booi	1,218	?	-
4	Miss L.E. Pourrier	1,218	?	-
5	C.L. Neuman	1,218	?	-
6	Miss M. de Bruin	1,218	?	-
Partido Progresista Boneriano
1	N. Debrot	750	?	-
2	F.M. Marchena	750	?	-
3	E.M. Newton	750	?	-
4	M.L. Booi	750	?	-
5	J.C. van der Rhee	750	?	-
6	S.C.A. Chirino	750	?	-

=== SSS Islands ===
Population: 3,578 (31 December 1949: Sint Maarten 1,513; Saba 1,110 & Eustatius 955)
Entitled to vote: 1,389 (Sint Maarten 558; Saba 469 & Sint Eustatius 362)
Valid votes: 1,005
Seats: 1

#	Candidate	Total per list	Votes	Result
List Voges
1	Ch.E.W. Voges	749	721	Elected
2	C.G. Buncamper	749	7	-
3	K. Peterson	749	4	-
4	H.S.L. Conner	749	13	-
4	A.C. Wathey	749	4	-
List Cruger
1	G.F.E. Cruger	134	134	-
Democratic Party (DP)
1	E. Jonckheer	122	26	-
2	C.D. Kroon	122	4	-
3	C.C. Peterson	122	77	-
4	O.R.A. Beaujon	122	6	-
5	S.W. van der Meer	122	4	-
6	R.J. Isa	122	5	-

== Aftermath ==
The new session of the Estates started on 21 February 1951 and a month later Isa became a temporary replacement for Braam.

Around April 1951 Da Costa Gomez and Sprockel gave up their position in the parliament to join the 'Regeringsraad' (early stage of the Council of Ministers). They were succeeded by Bartels Daal and Morkos.

Mid 1951 Tromp was succeeded by Amelink and Braam returned in the parliament after Kroon left. Later that year Morkos was replaced by Smit, Goslinga by Broos and Geerman by De la Fuente.

In 1952 Amelink was succeeded by Dirksz, Gerharts by Abraham and Goslinga returned to replace Broos. After Debrot temporarily left the parliament Morkos became a member of the Estates and later that year Smit gave up his seat so Debrot could return.

In 1953 Chumaceiro replaced Van der Hoeven for a few months.
