= 1941 Curaçao general election =

General elections were held in the Territory of Curaçao on 17 November 1941. Ten of the fifteen seats in the Estates of Curaçao were elected, with the remaining five appointed by the governor G.J.J. Wouters. The ten elected seats consisted of six for Curaçao, two for Aruba, one for Bonaire and one for the SSS Islands

From a population of 107,891 (December 1940) only 3,953 men, less than 4% of the population, were entitled to vote in the elections.

== Curaçao ==
Only one list of candidates was registered for the election on the island of Curaçao. It was the list of the Curaçaoan Roman Catholic Party (CRKP).

Population: 67,317 (31 December 1940)
Entitled to vote: 2,453
Valid votes: 1,477
Invalid votes: 85

#	Candidate	Votes	Result
1	Moises Frumencio da Costa Gomez	1,379	Elected
2	John Horris Sprockel	17	Elected
3	Elias Aloisius Römer	6	Elected
4	Adolphe Willem Jan Marie Desertine	15	Elected
5	Jean André Jacques Ellis	9	Elected
6	José Maria Pedro Kroon	10	Elected
7	Charles Baggs Debrot	10	-
8	Ernesto Cecilio Martijn	6	-
9	Constan Casiano	10	-
10	Jacobus Ambrosius Jonkhout	15	-

== Aruba ==
Population: 30,614 (31 December 1940)
Entitled to vote: 1,323
Valid votes: 1,167

#	Candidate	Total per list	Votes	Result
List 1 (Roman Catholic Party)
1	Jacob Rudolf Arends	244	226	-
2	Henri Anton Johannes Gijsen	244	13	-
3	Juan Enrique Croes	244	5	-
List 2 (Group Wever)
1	Aristides Eduviges Wever	208	208	-
List 3 (Group Eman)
1	Jan Hendrik Albert Eman	689	674	Elected
2	Frederik Johannes Quant Kwartsz	689	15	Elected
List 4 (Free Dutchman)
1	Johan Geraes Alvaer van Aggelen	26	19	-
2	Marinus Johannes Fokkers	26	4	-
3	Frederik Johannes Casper Beaujon	26	3	-

== Bonaire ==
Population: 5,616 (31 December 1940)
Entitled to vote: 76

Only one list of candidates was registered for the election on Bonaire. On it were two candidates:

1. John Aniceto de Jongh (elected)
2. Mauricio Marchena

The seat for Bonaire therefore went automatically to the first candidate of the list.

== SSS Islands ==
Entitled to vote: 101

William Rufus Plantz was the only candidate so the seat for the SSS Islands went automatically to him.

== Appointed by the governor ==
Governor Wouters assigned

- Jacob Rudolf Arends
- Ernesto Cecilio Martijn
- Salomon Alfred Senior
- Frederik Augustus Vromans
- Carel Nicolaas Winkel

to become members of the Estates. After Winkel resigned in 1944 because of health problems, governor P.A. Kasteel appointed Willem Pieter Maal as a new member of the Estates.

== Aftermath ==
The governor decided that Sprockel was the speaker of the parliament and Winkel the deputy speaker. Senior became the deputy speaker after Winkel left the parliament.

The new session of the Estates started on the first Tuesday of April 1942. Incumbent members who remained a member were: Da Costa Gomez, Sprockel, Desertine, Kroon, De Jongh, Plantz, Arends, Martijn, Senior, Vromans and Winkel
