= 1954 Netherlands Antilles general election =

General elections were held in the Netherlands Antilles on 15 November 1954.

The 22 seats in the Estates of the Netherlands Antilles consisted of twelve for Curaçao, eight for Aruba, one for Bonaire and one for the SSS Islands.

== Results ==
Party	Island	Votes	%	Seats
National People's Party	Curaçao	15,590		5
Democratic Party	Curaçao	13,620		5
Aruban Patriotic Party	Aruba	8,412		5
Catholic People's Party	Curaçao	4,865		1
Aruban People's Party	Aruba	3,822		2
Curaçaoan Independent Party	Curaçao	3,022		1
Aruban National Union	Aruba	1,749		1
List Lampe	SSS Islands	648		1
List Voges	SSS Islands	602		0
PBU/PPB	Bonaire			1
Bonaire Democratic Party	Bonaire			0
Total				22

=== Curaçao ===
Population: 114,683 (31 December 1953)
Entitled to vote: 44,363
Valid votes: 37,097
Seats: 12
Average valid votes per seat: 3,091.4

#	Candidate	Total per list	Votes	Result
National People's Party (NVP)
1	M.F. da Costa Gomez	15,590	15,037	Elected
2	H.G.M. Pieters Kwiers	15,590	74	Elected
3	N. Debrot	15,590	101	Elected
4	B.Ph. Römer	15,590	16	Elected
5	C.E. Dip	15,590	23	Elected
6	A.A. Lieder	15,590	20	-
7	Ch.E.W. Voges	15,590	137	-
8	J. Eleonora	15,590	9	-
9	C.E. Cathalina	15,590	20	-
10	S.D. Abbad	15,590	1	-
11	J.M.F. Pieters	15,590	5	-
12	E. Diaz	15,590	3	-
13	J.A. Schoop	15,590	10	-
14	P.N.A. Neuman	15,590	3	-
15	A.P. Loewenthal	15,590	20	-
16	E.A.V. Jesurun	15,590	20	-
17	H.M. Henriquez	15,590	91	-
Democratic Party (DP)
1	E. Jonckheer	13,620	10,493	Elected
2	C.D. Kroon	13,620	348	Elected
3	S.W. van der Meer	13,620	47	Elected
4	R.J. Isa	13,620	24	Elected
5	C.H.W. Hueck	13,620	11	-
6	H.L. Braam	13,620	2,149	Elected
7	Mrs. L.C. van der Linde-Helmijr	13,620	17	-
8	J.B. Rosario	13,620	6	-
9	F.J. Pijpers	13,620	10	-
10	O.R.A. Beaujon	13,620	19	-
11	J.A.O. Bikker	13,620	2	-
12	R.M. Martinez	13,620	7	-
13	J.G. Felix	13,620	17	-
14	J. Oenes	13,620	12	-
15	M.A. Margaretha	13,620	6	-
16	H.I. Lopes	13,620	408	-
17	P.H. Maal	13,620	0	-
Catholic People's Party (KVP)
1	I.C. Debrot	4,865	4,255	Elected
2	E.J. Morkos	4,865	95	-
3	B.M. Leito	4,865	73	-
4	E.C.J.M. van de Laarschot	4,865	213	-
5	Miss A.M.R. Rigaud	4,865	14	-
6	H.M. van Delden	4,865	104	-
7	J.L. Martina	4,865	22	-
8	Miss R.M. Panneflek	4,865	3	-
9	P.M. Maduro	4,865	10	-
10	P.A. Nicatia	4,865	3	-
11	E.R. Goilo	4,865	5	-
12	H.D. Feliz	4,865	7	-
13	M.R.W.B. Berkenveldt	4,865	17	-
14	V.R. Maduro	4,865	13	-
15	T.I. Janga	4,865	5	-
16	E.M. Zimmeman	4,865	5	-
17	M.A.T. Pinedo	4,865	21	-
Curaçaoan Independent Party (COP)
1	P. van der Hoeven	3,022	2,599	Elected
2	N.M. Chumaceiro	3,022	202	-
3	W. Meijer	3,022	21	-
4	Ph.J. Evertsz	3,022	6	-
5	J.G. van Gelder	3,022	25	-
6	A.N.Th. van Meeteren	3,022	20	-
7	C. van de Mark	3,022	14	-
8	E.J. van Romondt	3,022	6	-
9	L.J. Braumuller	3,022	23	-
10	Miss E.R. Lansberg	3,022	20	-
11	E.J. Ruiz	3,022	3	-
12	Ch.W. Wix	3,022	6	-
13	A.J. van Romondt	3,022	12	-
14	Miss C.M. Heidenreich	3,022	10	-
15	J.W.M. Diemont	3,022	13	-
16	Mrs. E.L. Segaar-Eldermans	3,022	19	-
17	J.W. van de Berg	3,022	23	-

=== Aruba ===
Population: 57,303 (31 December 1953)
Valid votes: 13,983
Seats: 8
Average valid votes per seat: 1,747.875

#	Candidate	Total per list	Votes	Result
Aruban Patriotic Party (PPA)
1	J.E. Irausquin	8,412	3,668	Elected
2	P. Croes	8,412	574	Elected
3	J. Erasmus	8,412	?	Elected
4	J.R.L. Beaujon	8,412	?	Elected
5	J. Maduro	8,412	?	Elected
6	W.C. Anslijn	8,412	486	-
7	E.R. Finck	8,412	698	-
8	O. Croes	8,412	30	-
9	J. Kelly	8,412	?	-
10	D.C. Mathew	8,412	?	-
11	I. Serphos	8,412	?	-
12	E.O. Petronia	8,412	?	-
13	C. Angela	8,412	?	-
Aruban People's Party (AVP)
1	J.H.A. Eman	3,822	?	Elected
2	J. Geerman	3,822	?	Elected
3	M.E. de Cuba	3,822	?	-
4	L. Laclé	3,822	?	-
5	A.J. Flanegin	3,822	?	-
6	S. Bruin	3,822	?	-
7	W.H. de la Fuente	3,822	?	-
8	F.E. Lejuez	3,822	?	-
9	M.H. Booi	3,822	?	-
10	J.A.C. Nieuw	3,822	?	-
11	J.E. Lejuez	3,822	?	-
12	E. Brokke	3,822	?	-
13	C.A. Eman	3,822	?	-
UNA
1	A. Werleman	1,749	?	Elected
2	Th.J. Figaroa	1,749	?	-
3	A.F. Dussenbroek	1,749	?	-
4	Th.D. Luydens	1,749	?	-
5	F.B. Tromp	1,749	?	-
6	J.G. Croes	1,749	?	-
7	L. Henriquez	1,749	?	-
8	C.P. Schwengle	1,749	?	-
9	N. Schuit	1,749	?	-
10	C.J. Maduro	1,749	?	-
11	B.J.M. Gomez	1,749	?	-

=== Bonaire ===
Population: 5,386 (31 December 1953)
Valid votes: ?
Seats: 1

#	Candidate	Total per list	Votes	Result
PBU/PPB
1	L.D. Gerharts	?	?	Elected
2	E.A. Booi	?	?	-
3	W. Booi	?	?	-
4	S. Soliano	?	?	-
5	I.C. Debrot	?	?	-
6	E.B. Sint Jago	?	?	-
Bonaire Democratic Party
1	J.A. Abraham	?	?	-
2	C.L. Neuman	?	?	-
3	C.D. Christiaan	?	?	-
4	H. Adoptie	?	?	-
5	A.A. Emerenciano	?	?	-
6	C.D. Kroon	?	?	-

=== SSS Islands ===
Population: 3,678 (31 December 1953)
Valid votes: 1,250
Seats: 1

#	Candidate	Total per list	Votes	Result
List Lampe
1	W.F.M. Lampe	648	412	Elected
2	H.I. Lopes	648	166	-
3	W.C. Anslijn	648	35	-
4	D.C. Mathew	648	5	-
5	H. Johnson	648	4	-
6	C. Labega	648	26	-
List Voges
1	Ch.E.W. Voges	602	544	-
2	C. Peterson	602	22	-
3	C. Buncamper	602	3	-
4	K. Peterson	602	1	-
5	W. Slicer	602	3	-
6	V. Lopes	602	29	-

== Aftermath ==
The new session of the Estates began around 8 December 1954. Before that Jonckheer, Kroon, Van der Meer and Lampe gave up their position in the parliament to become government ministers in the First Jonckheer cabinet. They were succeeded by Hueck, Van der Linde-Helmijr, Rosario and Lopes. Van der Linde-Helmijr was at that moment the only female in the parliament but not the first one; A.A. de Lannoy-Elisabeth was from 1949 until 1954 a female member of the Estates. Anslijn became a member of the parliament instead of Maduro.

Early 1955 Voges became a member of the parliament to replace Debrot and later that year O.R.A. Beaujon, Pieters Kwiers and P. Croes were succeeded by Bikker, Abbad and Finck. A year later Sint Jago succeeded Gerharts. After Eman died he was replaced by De Cuba.
