= 1937 Curaçao general election =

Election in the Territory of Curaçao

General elections were held in the Territory of Curaçao on 20 December 1937. Ten of the fifteen seats in the Estates of Curaçao were elected, with the remaining five appointed by the governor G.J.J. Wouters. The ten elected seats consisted of six for Curaçao, two for Aruba, one for Bonaire and one for the SSS Islands

From 1833 there was a Colonial Council ('Koloniale Raad') whose members were not elected. The council was replaced in April 1938 by the Estates of Curaçao. From a population of 90,870 (December 1936) only 2,754 men, about 3% of the population, were entitled to vote in the elections.

The new session of the Estates started on the first Tuesday of April 1938.

== Curaçao ==
Population: 58,233 (31 December 1936)
Entitled to vote: 2,030
Valid votes: 1,549
Invalide votes: 116

Lists of candidates:

- Curaçaoan Roman Catholic Party (CRKP)
- Curaçaoan Political Union (CPU)
- CSM pilots

Candidate	List	Preferred votes						Result
Candidate	List	1st	2nd	3rd	4th	5th	6th	Result
Isaac H. Capriles	CPU	189	170	55	45	18	12	Elected
Moises Frumencio da Costa Gomez	CRKP	330	24	24	17	12	329	Elected
Adolphe Willem Jan Marie Desertine	CRKP	40	621	28	22	7	6	Elected
C.W.J. Jonckheer	CPU	123	90	212	29	27	13	-
José Maria Pedro Kroon	CRKP	3	1	11	18	589	12	-
Willem Pieter Maal	CPU	193	53	131	37	28	8	Elected
Ernesto Cecilio Martijn	CRKP	315	8	9	16	31	296	Elected
Elias Aloisius Römer	CRKP	1	9	24	593	24	13	-
Jan Rustige	CPU	144	182	32	31	37	16	Elected
John Horris Sprockel	CRKP	4	17	575	2	16	13	-
H.G. Suares	CPU	12	229	64	44	35	23	-
J. Tinge	CSM pilots	195	29	60	36	14	35	-

== Aruba ==
Population: 21,638 (31 December 1936)
Entitled to vote: 553
Valid votes: 381

Candidate	Preferred votes		Result
Candidate	1st	2nd	Result
Jacob Rudolf Arends	197	19	Elected
J.H. Beaujon	119	27	-
A.T.D.H. de Boer	14	16	-
Jean M. de Cuba	17	169	Elected
Jan Hendrik Albert Eman	34	52	-

== Bonaire ==
Population: 5,827 (31 December 1936)
Entitled to vote: 31

- John Aniceto de Jongh (only candidate and therefore automatically elected)

== SSS Islands ==
Entitled to vote: 140
Valid votes: 107

Candidate	Votes	Result
A.R.W.S. Brouwer	34	-
William Rufus Plantz	73	Elected

== Appointed by the governor ==
- Frederik Philip Bichon van IJsselmonde
- Salomon Alfred Senior
- José Maria Pedro Kroon
- John Horris Sprockel
- Carel Nicolaas Winkel

In 1940 Bichon van IJsselmonde was succeeded by Frederik Augustus Vromans.

== Aftermath ==
Although a vast majority of the population was catholic, in the last Colonial Council only 4 of the 13 members were catholic. In the new Estates 8 out of the 15 members were catholic.

Sprockel did not receive enough votes to be elected but was soon after the elections appointed by the governor to be a member of the Estates. Originally Jossy Cohen Henriquez, speaker of the Colonial Council, was one of the members of Estates who were appointed by the governor. After S.M.L. Maduro died Cohen Henriquez succeeded him as member of the 'Raad van Bestuur' so he could no longer become a member of the Estates. A few days before the Estates started in April 1938 the governor appointed Senior instead of Cohen Henriquez. Wouters also decided Sprockel was the speaker of the parliament and Winkel the deputy speaker.
