= Juancho Yrausquin =

Netherlands Antillean banker and politician (1904–1962)

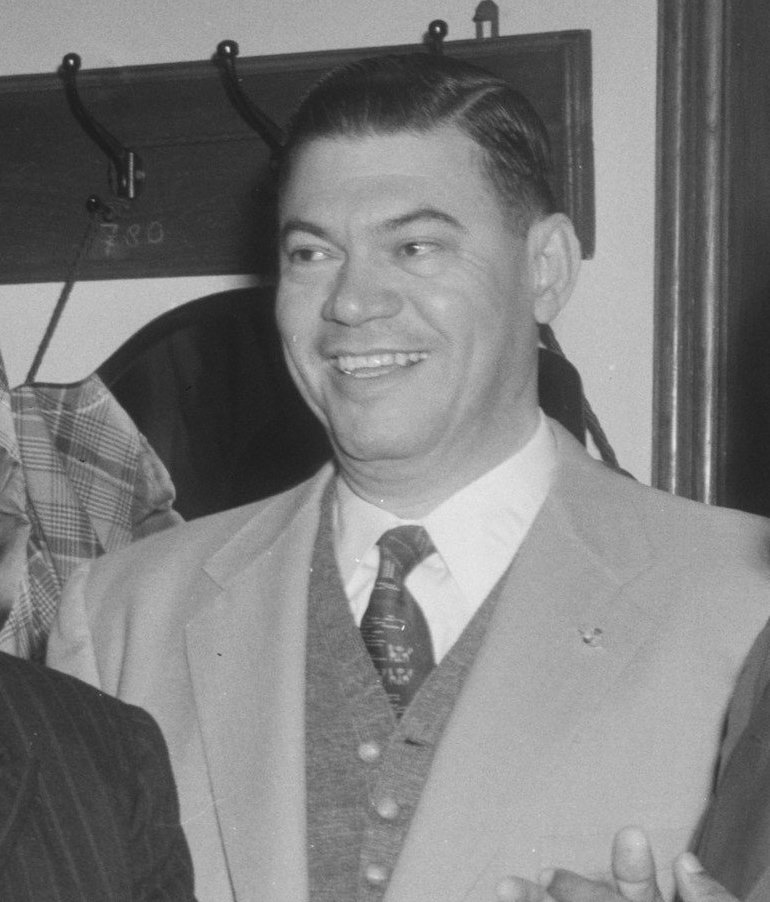
- Yrausquin in 1954

Minister of Finance
- In office 1 April 1956 – 20 June 1962
- Prime Minister: Efraïn Jonckheer
- Preceded by: Frederick Beaujon
- Succeeded by: Oscar Henriquez

Minister of Welfare
- In office 5 December 1957 – 20 June 1962
- Prime Minister: Efraïn Jonckheer
- Preceded by: A. E. Booi
- Succeeded by: Oscar Henriquez

Leader of the Aruban Patriotic Party
- In office 23 October 1949 – 20 June 1962
- Preceded by: Office established
- Succeeded by: Ernesto Petronia; Oscar Henriquez

President of the Estates
- In office 8 December 1954 – 20 March 1956
- Preceded by: Charles Voges
- Succeeded by: Ronchi Isa
- In office 12 May 1949 – 5 May 1950
- Preceded by: Elias Römer
- Succeeded by: William Plantz

Member of the Estates
- In office 28 October 1947 – 1 April 1956
- Preceded by: Victor Henriquez
- Constituency: Aruba

Member of the Island Council of Aruba
- In office 2 July 1951 – 1 April 1956
- Succeeded by: José Leonard

Personal details
- Born: Juan Enrique Yrausquin; 3 December 1904 Oranjestad, Curaçao and Dependencies (present-day Aruba)
- Died: 20 June 1962 (aged 57) Willemstad, Netherlands Antilles (present-day Curaçao)
- Party: Aruban Patriotic Party
- Other political affiliations: Aruban People's Party (until 1949)
- Spouse: Maria Wajcberg (m. 1943)
- Occupation: Banker; politician

Juan Enrique "Juancho" Yrausquin (3 December 1904 – 20 June 1962), also spelled Irausquin, was a Netherlands Antillean banker and politician of the Aruban Patriotic Party (PPA). He served as Minister of Finance and Welfare in the first and second Jonckheer cabinets until his death on 20 June 1962.

== Biography ==
=== Early life and career ===
Juan Enrique Yrausquin was born on 3 December 1904 in Oranjestad on the island of Aruba, which at the time was a part of the Dutch colony of Curaçao and Dependencies. His parents were of Basque Venezuelan descent. After completing his primary education on Aruba, Yrausquin continued his studies on Curaçao, taking courses in accounting and commerce. At the age of fourteen, he began working for the Hollandsche Bank. In 1929, he switched to the John G. Eman Bank, the first commercial bank of Aruba, which co-founded the Aruba Bank in 1936. Yrausquin was appointed director of the newly formed bank, and retired from this position in 1951.

=== Political career ===
Yrausquin unsuccessfully participated in the 1945 general election as the third candidate on the electoral list led by Henny Eman, which won two of the three Aruban seats in the Estates. Nonetheless, he was appointed to the body by acting governor Cornelius Süthoff on 28 October 1947, after one of the five governor-appointed members had vacated their seat. In 1949, he participated in the first parliamentary election after the introduction of universal suffrage, winning a seat on behalf of the Aruban People's Party (AVP). Shortly after, he succeeded Elias Römer as president of the Estates.

Due to disagreements with party leader Henny Eman, Yrausquin and Porfirio Croes left the AVP and founded the Aruban Patriotic Party (PPA) on 23 October 1949. Yrausquin was re-elected into the Estates in the 1950, 1954 and 1958 general elections, and won a seat in the island council of Aruba in the 1951 and 1955 island council elections. During his tenure as member of the Estates, he was part of the Antillean delegation to the round table conferences on the restructuring of the Kingdom of the Netherlands, held between 1948 and 1954 in The Hague.

Following the 1954 election, he was tasked with leading the formation of a coalition government. As formateur, he formed the first Jonckheer cabinet, but did not become a member of the cabinet himself. Instead, he was given a second term as president of the Estates. In April 1956, a cabinet reshuffle led to the appointment of Yrausquin as Minister of Finance. Later, in 1957, responsibility for the Ministry of Welfare was added to his portfolio. After the 1958 election, he held on to the position of Minister of Finance and Welfare in the second Jonckheer cabinet, which was installed on 3 October 1958.

== Personal life ==
Yrausquin married Maria Wajcberg on 17 June 1943 in Miami. The couple did not have children. Juan David Yrausquin, who served as Minister of Finance of Aruba from 2013 to 2014, is his second cousin twice removed.

== Death and legacy ==
Yrausquin died on 20 June 1962 in the Sint-Elisabeth Hospital in Willemstad, after suffering a heart attack during a meeting of the Council of Ministers. A politician of the Radical People's Party (PRP), Willem van Lamoen, later claimed that the police investigated his death to rule out a possible poisoning. According to Van Lamoen, a maid working for Prime Minister Efraïn Jonckheer was suspected of poisoning Yrausquin's coffee, but was released after three days in custody.

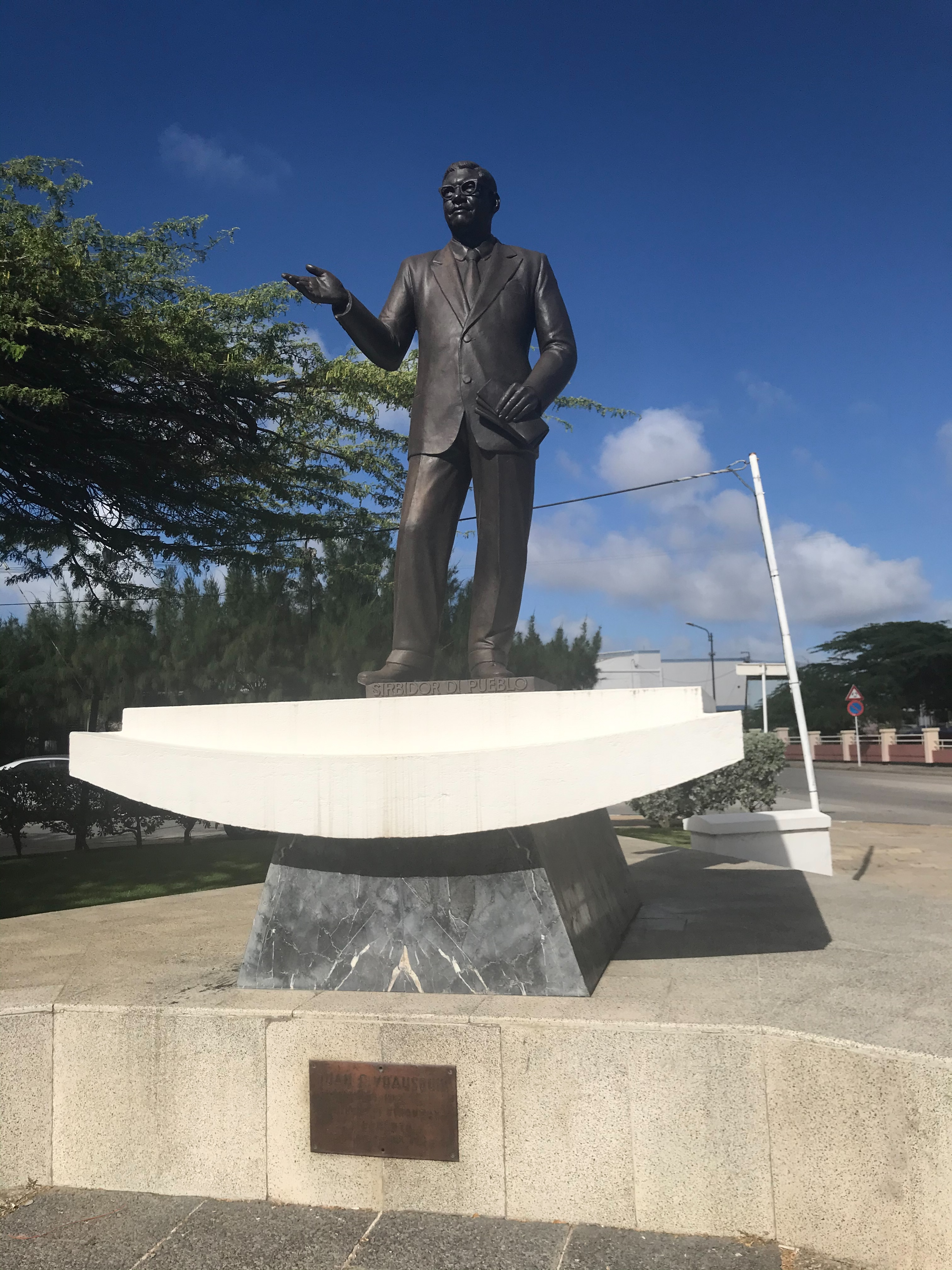
Statue of Yrausquin in Oranjestad

Yrausquin is acknowledged for his role in advancing the tourism industry and economic infrastructure of Aruba and the other islands of the Dutch Caribbean. Juancho E. Yrausquin Airport, the airport of Saba, was named after him in honor of his efforts to secure funding for its construction. A statue of Yrausquin was erected in Oranjestad in 1968.

== Electoral history ==
Electoral history of
Year	Body	Party	Pos.	Votes	Result	
Year	Body	Party	Pos.	Votes	Party seats	Individual
1945	Estates (Territory of Curaçao)	Eman List	3	18	2	Lost (Note: Yrausquin was appointed to the body later during the term due to a vacancy.)
1949	Estates (Netherlands Antilles)	Aruban People's Party	2	192	5	Won
1950	Estates (Netherlands Antilles)	Aruban Patriotic Party	2	1,103	2	Won
1951	Island council of Aruba	Aruban Patriotic Party	1	[?]	8	Won
1954	Estates (Netherlands Antilles)	Aruban Patriotic Party	1	3,668	5	Won
1955	Island council of Aruba	Aruban Patriotic Party	1	[?]	15	Won
1958	Estates (Netherlands Antilles)	Aruban Patriotic Party	1	3,683	5	Won

== Honors ==
- Kingdom of the Netherlands: Officer of the Order of Orange-Nassau (1950)
