= 1949 Netherlands Antilles general election =

General elections were held in the Netherlands Antilles on 17 March 1949. This was the first parliamentary election in the Netherlands Antilles after the introduction of universal suffrage. At previous elections ten of the fifteen seats in the Estates of Curaçao were elected, with the remaining five appointed by the governor. This time the elections were about 21 seats in the Estates of the Netherlands Antilles and no seats were appointed by the governor. The 21 elected seats consisted of eight for Curaçao, eight for Aruba, two for Bonaire and one for each of the three SSS Islands.

== Results ==
Party	Island	Votes	%	Seats
National People's Party	Curaçao	13,224	29.91	4
Democratic Party	Curaçao	10,006	22.63	3
Aruban People's Party	Aruba	6,257	14.15	5
Catholic People's Party	Curaçao	5,305	12.00	1
Aruban National Union	Aruba	4,799	10.86	3
Curaçaoan Independent Party	Curaçao	2,165	4.90	0
List 3	Bonaire	952	2.15	1
List 1	Bonaire	483	1.09	1
List 2	Bonaire	317	0.72	0
List 2	Saba	281	0.64	1
List 1	Sint Eustatius	169	0.38	1
List 1	Saba	104	0.24	0
List 2	Sint Eustatius	97	0.22	0
Kwartsz List	Aruba	51	0.12	0
List 1	Sint Maarten			1
Total		44,210	100.00	21
Registered voters/turnout		53,529	–	

=== Curaçao ===
Population: 95,195 (31 December 1948)
Entitled to vote: 37,688
Valid votes: 30,700
Invalid votes: 476
Seats: 8
Average valid votes per seat: 3,837.5

#	Candidate	Total per list	Votes	Result
National People's Party (NVP)
1	M.F. da Costa Gomez	13,224	12,834	Elected
2	H.G.M. Pieters Kwiers	13,224	109	Elected
3	E. Cohen Henriquez	13,224	20	Elected
4	J. van Toorn	13,224	5	Elected
5	Mrs. A.A. de Lannoy-Elisabeth	13,224	19	-
6	E.C.B. Bartels Daal	13,224	13	-
7	J.I. Boom	13,224	3	-
8	E. Rozendaal	13,224	4	-
9	J.R.A. Simoons	13,224	45	-
10	M.E. Dovale	13,224	2	-
11	W.R. Plantz	13,224	3	-
12	E.M. Newton	13,224	??	-
13	B.Ph. Römer	13,224	5	-
Democratic Party (DP)
1	E. Jonckheer	10,006	7,833	Elected
2	C.D. Kroon	10,006	54	Elected
3	S.W. van der Meer	10,006	45	-
4	R.J. Isa	10,006	13	-
5	C.H.W. Hueck	10,006	22	-
6	H.L. Braam	10,006	1,848	Elected
7	P.H. Maal	10,006	76	-
8	Mrs. L.C. van der Linde-Helmijr	10,006	2	-
9	C.G. da Costa Gomez	10,006	?	-
10	J.B. Rosario	10,006	0?	-
11	Miss C.C. van Uyten	10,006	15	-
12	R. Martinez	10,006	8	-
13	R. Beaujon	10,006	85	-
Catholic People's Party (KVP)
1	I.C. Debrot	5,305	4,341	Elected
2	Mrs. A. Henriquez-Con	5,305	124	-
3	A.M. Smit	5,305	100	-
4	Miss A.M. van der Dijs	5,305	25	-
5	P. Möhlmann	5,305	603	-
6	M.R.W.B. Berkenveld	5,305	41	-
7	Miss M.M.J. de Lannoy	5,305	14	-
8	E.J. Morkos	5,305	57	-
Curaçaoan Independent Party (COP)
1	H.B.C. Schotborgh	2,165	893	-
2	P. van der Hoeven	2,165	1,066	-
3	C. Lopez Delvalle	2,165	107	-
4	R.R. Muskus	2,165	10	-
5	Mrs. E. Nieuwstraten-Fränkel	2,165	15	-
6	J.W. v.d. Meulen	2,165	6	-
7	W. Meijer	2,165	38	-
8	O.W. Rigaud	2,165	30	-

=== Aruba ===
Population: 51,110 (31 December 1948)
Entitled to vote: 12,819
Valid votes: 11,107
Invalid votes: 288
Seats: 8
Average valid votes per seat: 1,388 3/8

#	Candidate	Total per list	Votes	Result
Aruban People's Party (AVP)
1	J.H.A. Eman	6,257	5,690	Elected
2	J.E. Irausquin	6,257	192	Elected
3	P. Croes	6,257	120	Elected
4	J. Geerman	6,257	107	Elected
5	M.E. de Cuba	6,257	34	Elected
6	A.J. Flanegin	6,257	17	-
7	G. Croes	6,257	3	-
8	A.E. Wever	6,257	9	-
9	H.P. Oduber	6,257	9	-
10	A.O. Scholten	6,257	10	-
11	J.J.P. Oduber	6,257	66	-
Aruban National Union (UNA)
1	F.B. Tromp	4,799	2,415	Elected
2	A.F. Dussenbroek	4,799	396	Elected
3	M.S. Arends	4,799	88	Elected
4	G. Amelink	4,799	87	-
5	Mrs. L.S. Wernet-Paskel	4,799	13	-
6	J.V. de Cuba	4,799	190	-
7	T.D. Luydens	4,799	16	-
8	H.P.E. Ecury	4,799	137	-
9	A. Werleman	4,799	37	-
10	R.M. Robles	4,799	699	-
11	C. Maduro	4,799	24	-
12	G.J. Schouten	4,799	258	-
13	W. Nisbet	4,799	439	-
Kwartsz List
1	F.J.Q. Kwartsz	51	51	-

=== Bonaire ===
Population: 4,995 (31 December 1948)
Entitled to vote: 2,224
Valid votes: 1,752
Seats: 2
Average valid votes per seat: 876

#	Candidate	Total per list	Votes	Result
List 1
1	M. Marchena	483	456	Elected
2	M.L. Booi	483	27	-
List 2
1	E. Newton	317	149	-
2	C. Hellmund	317	168	-
List 3
1	J.A. Abraham	952	229	-
2	W. Booi	952	42	-
3	L.D. Gerharts	952	522	Elected
4	M. de Bruin	952	45	-
5	C.L. Neuman	952	36	-
6	J.L. Ramirez	952	3	-
7	E. Sint Jago	952	75	-

=== Saba ===
Population: 1.125 (31 December 1948)
Entitled to vote: 451
Valid votes: 385
Invalid votes: 15
Seats: 1

#	Candidate	Total per list	Votes	Result
List 1
1	M.R.W.B. Berkenveld	104	8	-
2	Th. van Hugh Hassell	104	96	-
List 2
1	W.G. Buncamper	281	101	-
2	W.R. Plantz	281	1	-
3	C.E.W. Voges	281	179	Elected

=== Sint Eustatius ===
Population: 921 (31 December 1948)
Entitled to vote: 347
Valid votes: 266
Invalid votes: 15
Seats: 1

#	Candidate	Total per list	Votes	Result
List 1
1	G.F.E. Cruger	169	154	Elected
2	C.G. Buncamper	169	0	-
3	W.R. Plantz	169	15	-
List 2
1	P.H. Maal	97	89	-
2	S. Rogers	97	8	-

=== Sint Maarten ===
Population: 1,568 (31 December 1948)
Entitled to vote: 578
Valid votes: n.a. (only one list of candidates)
Seats: 1

#	Candidate	Result
List 1
1	W.R. Plantz	Elected
2	C.E.W. Voges	-
3	L.R. Carthy	-
4	W.G. Buncamper	-

== Aftermath ==
The new session of the Estates started on 18 April 1949.

At this election women could not only for the first time vote for the parliament, there were also female candidates. None of them however were elected. After M.F. da Costa Gomez gave up his position in the parliament to join the 'College van Algemeen Bestuur' (CAB; early stage of the Council of Ministers), De Lannoy-Elisabeth succeeded him mid 1949 and became the first female member of the parliament in the Netherlands Antilles. Plantz also joined the CAB and was succeeded by Buncamper.

Kroon left the parliament and because Van der Meer turned down the opportunity to succeed him, Isa could become a member of the Estates. At the end of 1949 Arends was succeeded by Amelink and Plantz returned after Buncamper gave up his seat in the parliament.
