= First Jonckheer cabinet =

- 1st Cabinet of the Netherlands Antilles

- Date formed: 8 December 1954
- Date dissolved: 3 October 1958

People and organisations
- Head of state: Juliana of the Netherlands
- Head of government: Efrain Jonckheer

History
- Election: 1954 election
- Outgoing election: 1958 election
- Successor: Jonckheer II

The First Jonckheer cabinet was the 1st cabinet of the Netherlands Antilles after the ratification of the Charter for the Kingdom of the Netherlands.

== Composition ==
The cabinet was composed as follows:

Main office-holders
Office	Name	Party	Since
Minister of General Affairs	Efrain Jonckheer	DP-cur	8 December 1954
Minister of Finance	Juan E. Irausquin	PPA	1 April 1956
Minister of Justice	Frederick C.J. Beaujon	PPA	8 December 1954
Minister of Justice	S.W. van der Meer	DP-cur	1 April 1956
Minister of Education and Popular Education	A.E. Booi	NPB	8 December 1954
Minister of Education and Popular Education	Frederick C.J. Beaujon	PPA	23 August 1958
Minister of Traffic and Communications	Wem Lampe	PPA	8 December 1954
Minister of Traffic and Communications	Frederick C.J. Beaujon	PPA	1 April 1956
Minister of Public Health	S.W. van der Meer	DP-cur	8 December 1954
Minister of Public Health	A.E. Booi	NPB	23 July 1955
Minister of Public Health	Frederick C.J. Beaujon	PPA	1 April 1956
Minister of Social Affairs	S.W. van der Meer	DP-cur	8 December 1954
Minister of Social Affairs	Efrain Jonckheer	DP-cur	1 April 1956
Minister of Social Affairs	Ciro Domenico Kroon	DP-cur	7 November 1957
Minister of Economic Affairs	E.J. van Romondt	COP	8 December 1954
Minister of Economic Affairs	A.E. Booi	NPB	31 May 1957
Minister of Economic Affairs	Ciro Domenico Kroon	DP-cur	5 December 1957
Minister of Welfare	E.J. van Romondt	COP	8 December 1954
Minister of Welfare	A.E. Booi	NPB	31 May 1957
Minister of Welfare	Juan E. Irausquin	PPA	5 December 1957

- DP - Democratische Partij op Curaçao
- PPA - Partido Patriotico di Aruba
- COP - Curaçaosche Onafhankelijke Partij
- NPB - Nationale Partij op Bonaire
