= Angela Altagracia de Lannoy-Willems =

Member of the Estates
- In office 1949–1954
- Constituency: Curaçao

Member of Curaçao Island Council
- In office 1951–

Personal details
- Born: 31 May 1913 Curaçao
- Died: 10 July 1983 (aged 70) Willemstad, Curaçao

Angela Altagracia "Tata" de Lannoy-Willems (31 May 1913 – 10 July 1983) was a Curaçaoan politician. In 1949 she became the first female member of the Estates of the Netherlands Antilles.

== Biography ==
The 1949 elections to the Estates of the Netherlands Antilles were the first held under universal suffrage. Using the name De Lannoy-Elisabeth she was a candidate of the National People's Party. Initially she was not elected but a few months after the elections she succeeded M.F. da Costa Gomez and became the first female member of the Estates. She was re-elected in 1950, remaining a member until 1954. In 1951 she was also appointed to the Council of Ministers and was also elected to Curaçao Island Council.
