= Antillenhuis =

Building in The Hague, Netherlands

Coordinates: 52.102283°N 4.300380°E

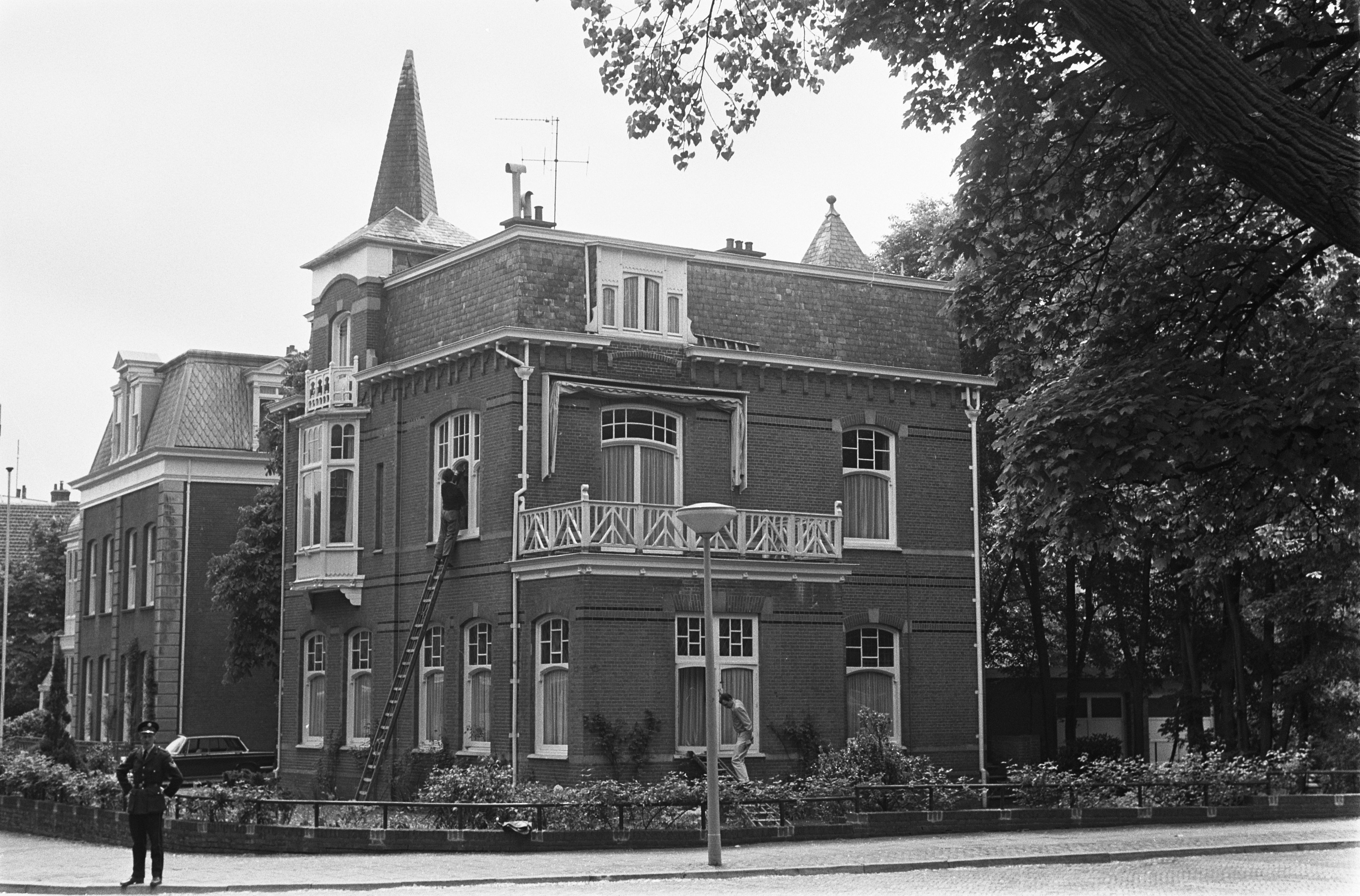
Antillenhuis (1969)

The Antillenhuis (English: Antilles' House) was the cabinet of the Minister Plenipotentiary of the Netherlands Antilles in The Hague, the Netherlands. The office was established in 1955 with Wem Lampe. The last Minister Plenipotentiary was Marcel van der Plank, who left office when the Netherlands Antilles were dissolved, in 2010.
