= Irausquin =

Irausquin or Yrausquin is a surname. Notable people with the surname include:

- Juancho Yrausquin, Netherlands Antillean banker and politician
  - Juancho E. Yrausquin Airport, Saba, Netherlands
- Juan David Yrausquin, Aruban politician
- Maria Irausquin-Wajcberg, Aruban politician
- Percy Irausquin, Aruban-born Dutch fashion designer and couturier
- Víctor Vargas Irausquín, Venezuelan banker and businessman
