= Kasteel =

Kasteel is the Dutch language word for a castle or château.

It can also refer to:

- Sparta Stadion Het Kasteel, a football stadium
- Joop Kasteel (born 1964), a Dutch mixed martial artist
- Piet Kasteel (1901–2003), a Dutch journalist, diplomat, and colonial administrator
