= Van der Plank =

Van der Plank is a Dutch surname. Notable people with the surname include:

- Marcel van der Plank (born 1951), Dutch politician;
- Wendy van der Plank (born 1963), British actress.
