= 1958 Netherlands Antilles general election =

General elections were held in the Netherlands Antilles on 1 September 1958. This snap election was held after discussions about changing the Charter for the Kingdom of the Netherlands.

== Results ==
Party	Island	Votes	%	Seats
National People's Party	Curaçao	20,353	30.97	6
Democratic Party	Curaçao	18,771	28.57	5
Aruban Patriotic Party	Aruba	9,912	15.08	5
Catholic People's Party	Curaçao	5,487	8.35	1
Aruban People's Party	Aruba	4,505	6.86	2
Aruban National Union	Aruba	2,059	3.13	1
Bonaire Democratic Party	Bonaire	1,373	2.09	1
Partido Boneriano Uni	Bonaire	1,138	1.73	0
Democratic Party Sint Maarten	SSS Islands	904	1.38	1
National People's Party–Aruba	Aruba	685	1.04	0
National People's Party	SSS Islands	521	0.79	0
Total		65,708	100.00	22

=== Curaçao ===
Population: 124,340 (31 December 1957)
Entitled to vote: 49,636
Valid votes: 44,611
Seats: 12
Average valid votes per seat: 3,717.58

#	Candidate	Total per list	Votes	Result
National People's Party (NVP) / Curaçaoan Independent Party (COP)
1	M.F. da Costa Gomez	20,353	17,448	Elected
2	H.G.M. Pieters Kwiers	20,353	90	Elected
3	B.Ph. Römer	20,353	36	Elected
4	P. van der Hoeven	20,353	1,971	Elected
5	C.E. Dip	20,353	70	Elected
6	Ch.E.W. Voges	20,353	133	Elected
7	S.D. Abbad	20,353	80	-
8	C.E. Cathalina	20,353	29	-
9	E.J. van Romondt	20,353	159	-
10	A.R. Winklaar	20,353	25	-
11	W. de Boer	20,353	124	-
12	A.P. Loewenthal	20,353	18	-
13	G.E.A. Booi	20,353	33	-
14	P.A. Lauffer	20,353	6	-
15	Ph.J. Evertsz	20,353	23	-
16	E.L.C. van Rosberg	20,353	13	-
17	F.R. Brion	20,353	55	-
Democratic Party (DP)
1	E. Jonckheer	18,771	14,071	Elected
2	C.D. Kroon	18,771	757	Elected
3	S.W. van der Meer	18,771	90	Elected
4	R.J. Isa	18,771	51	Elected
5	C.H.W. Hueck	18,771	27	-
6	H.L. Braam	18,771	2,352	Elected
7	Mrs. L.C. van der Linde-Helmijr	18,771	46	-
8	J.A.O. Bikker	18,771	24	-
9	R. Elhage	18,771	69	-
10	P.A. van der Veen	18,771	32	-
11	D. van der Ree	18,771	38	-
12	S.G.M. Rozendal	18,771	31	-
13	A.G. de Windt	18,771	48	-
14	M.A. Margaretha	18,771	34	-
15	C.C. Peterson	18,771	1,005	-
16	M.J. Vidal	18,771	16	-
17	E.M.H. Agnes	18,771	40	-
Catholic People's Party (KVP)
1	I.C. Debrot	5,487	3,669	Elected
2	B.M. Leito	5,487	108	-
3	J.L. Martina	5,487	93	-
4	J.J. Buhre	5,487	1,033	-
5	H.M. van Delden	5,487	137	-
6	M.J.M. Lichtveld	5,487	104	-
7	P. Maduro	5,487	12	-
8	V.C. Vinck	5,487	75	-
9	H.G. Zimmerman	5,487	65	-
10	E.J. Morkos	5,487	63	-
11	G.T. Lauff	5,487	5	-
12	Miss R.M. Panneflek	5,487	20	-
13	W. Rigaud	5,487	22	-
14	V.R. Maduro	5,487	18	-
15	R.T. Macares	5,487	26	-
16	E.C. Albertoe	5,487	18	-
17	W.R. Hooi	5,487	19	-

=== Aruba ===
Population: 57,213 (31 December 1957)
Entitled to vote: 18,642
Valid votes: 17,161
Seats: 8
Average valid votes per seat: 2,145.125

#	Candidate	Total per list	Votes	Result
Aruban Patriotic Party (PPA)
1	J.E. Irausquin	9,912	3,683	Elected
2	M. Henriquez	9,912	346	Elected
3	J. Erasmus	9,912	465	Elected
4	O. Croes	9,912	112	Elected
5	E.R. Finck	9,912	890	Elected
6	W.C. Anslijn	9,912	1142	-
7	J.R.L. Beaujon	9,912	139	-
8	F. Sebastiano	9,912	486	-
9	J. Geerman	9,912	592	-
10	E.O. Petronia	9,912	518	-
11	J.M. Leonardo	9,912	158	-
12	D.C. Mathew	9,912	772	-
13	C. Angela	9,912	612	-
Aruban People's Party (AVP)
1	C.A. Eman	4,505	2946	Elected
2	D.G. Croes	4,505	648	Elected
3	M. Croes	4,505	176	-
4	L.V. Britten	4,505	114	-
5	J.A. Croes	4,505	24	-
6	S. Geerman	4,505	87	-
7	D. Flemming	4,505	109	-
8	M. Arends	4,505	13	-
9	J.C. Lampe	4,505	59	-
10	A.H. Raven	4,505	55	-
11	J.P. Falconi	4,505	46	-
12	E.M. Lacle	4,505	93	-
13	F. Maduro	4,505	142	-
UNA
1	A. Werleman	2,059	1087	Elected
2	F.B. Tromp	2,059	262	-
3	A.F. Dussenbroek	2,059	344	-
4	M.J. Croes	2,059	60	-
5	Th.J. Figaroa	2,059	148	-
6	R.C. Oduber	2,059	19	-
7	L. Wever	2,059	30	-
8	Th.D. Luydens	2,059	19	-
9	Miss T.F. Palm	2,059	28	-
10	Th. Leest	2,059	13	-
11	R.E. Frank	2,059	16	-
12	I. Croes	2,059	6	-
13	C.P. Schwengle	2,059	22	-
NVP-A
1	M.F. da Costa Gomez	685	225	-
2	D.A. Vlaun	685	66	-
3	A.W.A. Heidewiller	685	104	-
4	G. Swart	685	69	-
5	M.P. Boekhouder	685	71	-
6	J. Eleonora	685	18	-
7	W.T. Holman	685	18	-
8	J. Priest	685	21	-
9	C.R. Beukenboom	685	21	-
10	E. Erasmus	685	10	-
11	F.B. Figaroa	685	33	-
12	E.M. Bronswinkel	685	19	-
13	O.A. Hassell	685	10	-

=== Bonaire ===
Population: 5,663 (31 December 1957)
Entitled to vote: 2,623
Valide votes: 2,511
Seats: 1

#	Candidate	Total per list	Votes	Result
Bonaire Democratic Party (PDB)
1	J.A. Abraham	1,373	?	Elected
2	C.D. Christiaan	1,373	?	-
3	Miss M.C. Hellmund	1,373	?	-
4	J.H.R. Herrera	1,373	?	-
5	A.J.H. Snijder	1,373	?	-
6	A.A. Emerenciano	1,373	?	-
UNI
1	S.C.G. Soliano	1,138	?	-
2	A.E. Booi	1,138	?	-
3	Ch.J.A. Beukeboom	1,138	?	-
4	F.C.A. Chirino	1,138	?	-
5	E.B. Sint Jago	1,138	?	-
6	L.D. Gerharts	1,138	?	-

=== SSS Islands ===
Population: 3,769 (31 December 1957, Sint Maarten: 1,558; Sint Eustatius: 1,087; Saba: 1,124)
Valide votes: 1,425
Seats: 1

#	Candidate	Total per list	Votes	Result
DP
1	H.I. Lopes	904	646	Elected
2	A.C. Wathey	904	158	-
3	D.C. Mathew	904	23	-
4	W.C. Anslijn	904	49	-
5	R.A. Sorton	904	4	-
6	A. Schmidt	904	24	-
NVP
1	Ch.E.W. Voges	521	404	-
2	H. Hassel	521	60	-
3	E. Ridson	521	4	-
4	C. Woodley	521	13	-
5	C. Peterson	521	12	-
6	S. Hazel	521	28	-

== Aftermath ==
Jonckheer, Kroon, Van der Meer and Irausquin gave up their seats in parliament to become ministers in the Second Jonckheer cabinet. The first three were replaced by Hueck, Van der Linde-Helmijr and Bikker. Abbad was the replacement for Pieters Kwiers. Mid 1959 Leito succeeded Debrot.

Abraham died at the end of 1960.
