= Second Jonckheer cabinet =

- 2nd Cabinet of the Netherlands Antilles

- Date formed: 3 October 1958
- Date dissolved: 2 November 1962

People and organisations
- Head of state: Juliana of the Netherlands
- Head of government: Efrain Jonckheer

History
- Election: 1958 election
- Outgoing election: 1962 election
- Predecessor: Jonckheer I
- Successor: Jonckheer III

The Second Jonckheer cabinet was the 2nd cabinet of the Netherlands Antilles.

== Composition ==
The cabinet was composed as follows:

Main office-holders
Office	Name	Party	Since
Minister of General Affairs	Efrain Jonckheer	DP-cur	3 October 1958
Minister of Social Affairs, Economic Affairs	Ciro Domenico Kroon	DP-cur	3 October 1958
Minister of Justice	S.W. van der Meer	DP-cur	3 October 1958
Minister of Justice	Ramez Jorge Isa	DP-cur	17 August 1959
Minister of Traffic and Communications	Frederick C.J. Beaujon ^{[Appt]}	PPA	3 October 1958
Minister of Traffic and Communications	Efrain Jonckheer	DP-cur	
Minister of Traffic and Communications	Ernesto O. Petronia	PPA	1 June 1961
Minister of Public Health	Frederick C.J. Beaujon ^{[Appt]}	PPA	3 October 1958
Minister of Public Health	Isaac C. Debrot	KVP	13 July 1959
Minister of Welfare	Juan E. Irausquin ^{[Note]}	PPA	3 October 1958
Minister of Welfare	Oscar S. Henriquez	PPA	10 July 1962
Minister of Finance	Juan E. Irausquin ^{[Note]}	PPA	3 October 1958
Minister of Finance	Oscar S. Henriquez	PPA	10 July 1962
Minister of Education and Popular Education	Ciro Domenico Kroon	DP-cur	3 October 1958
Minister of Education and Popular Education	Felipito B. Tromp	UNA	19 December 1958
Minister of Education and Popular Education	Francisco D. Figaroa	UNA	1 June 1961

^{Appt} Beaujon was appointed Lieutenant governor of Aruba.
^{Note} Irausquin died unexpectedly on 20 June 1962.
