= 1955 Netherlands Antilles island council elections =

Island council elections were held in the Netherlands Antilles in 1955. They were the second elections for the Island Council.

== Aruba ==
Three parties participated, which had participated in 1951: the Aruban Patriotic Party, Aruban People's Party and Aruba National Union (which had been two parties in the 1951 elections; UNA-I and UNA-II).

=== Results ===
Party	Votes	%	Seats	+/–
Aruban Patriotic Party	9,627	66.79	15	+7
Aruban People's Party	2,533	17.57	3	–5
Aruba National Union	2,254	15.64	3	–2
Total	14,414	100.00	21	0
Valid votes	14,414	98.56		
Invalid/blank votes	210	1.44		
Total votes	14,624	100.00		
Registered voters/turnout	16,480	88.74		
Source: Hartog

== Sint Maarten ==
The result was a victory for the Democratic Party, which won four of the five Island Council seats.

=== Results ===
Party	Votes	%	Seats
Democratic Party	365	66.97	4
National People's Party	180	33.03	1
Total	545	100.00	5
Valid votes	545	97.15	
Invalid/blank votes	16	2.85	
Total votes	561	100.00	
Registered voters/turnout	614	91.37	
Source: Lynch & Lynch
