= Frans Figaroa =

Aruban politician

Francisco Dominico Figaroa
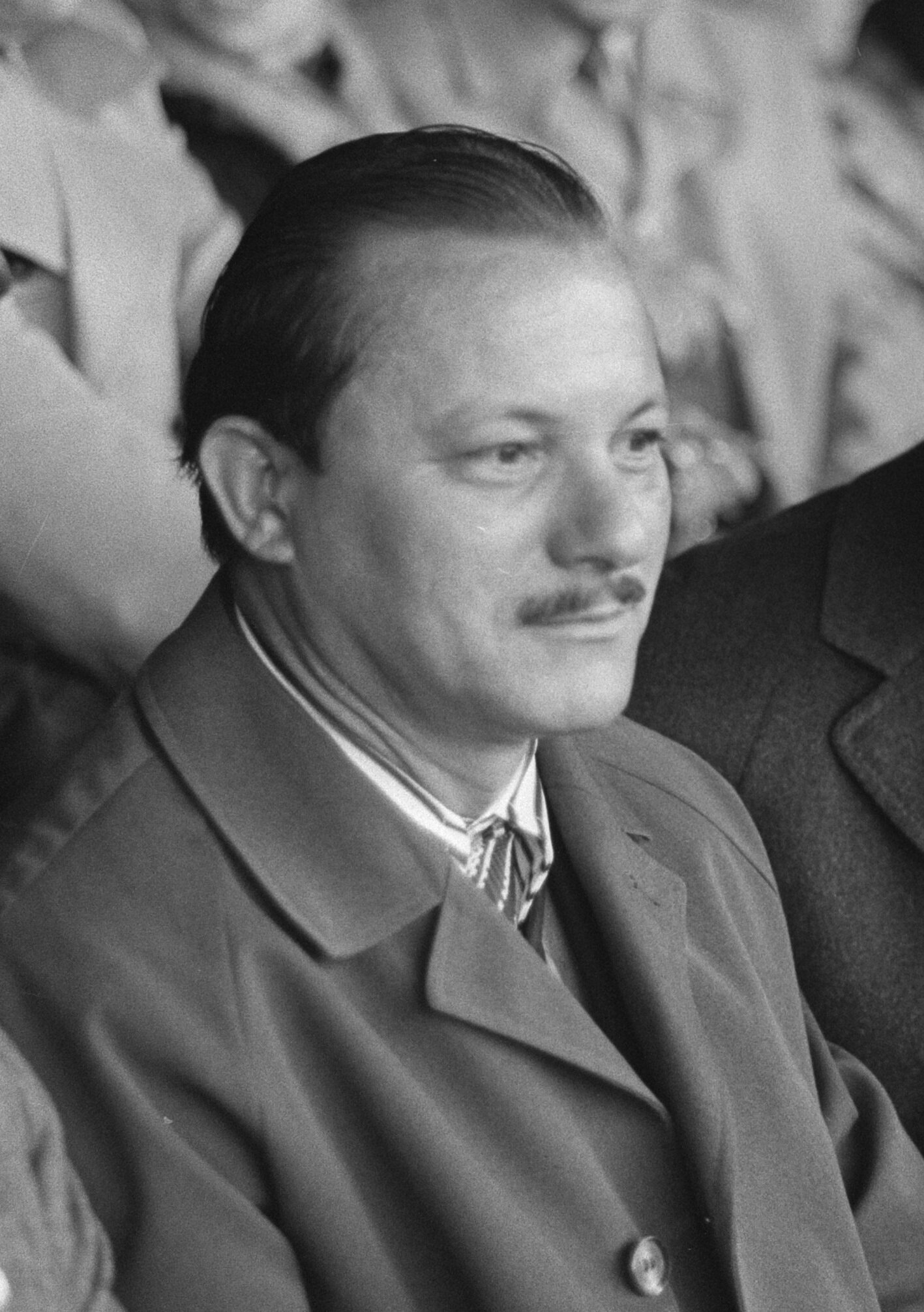
- Frans Figaroa in 1975

Lieutenant governor of Aruba
- In office 1979–1982
- Preceded by: Francisco Jose Tromp
- Succeeded by: Pedro Bislip

President of the Parliament of the Netherlands Antilles
- In office 1979
- Preceded by: Onofre Bikker
- Succeeded by: Betico Croes
- In office 1975–1976
- Preceded by: Ricardo ElHage
- Succeeded by: Amos Nita

Member of the Island Council
- In office 1963–1967

Minister of Education of the Netherlands Antilles
- In office 1961–1962
- Preceded by: Felipe Tromp
- Succeeded by: Ernesto Petronia

Personal details
- Born: 3 September 1927
- Died: 7 October 1993 (aged 66)
- Party: UNA / MEP

Francisco Dominico "Frans" Figaroa (3 September 1927 – 6 October 1993) was an Aruban politician who served as Lieutenant governor of Aruba from 1979 until 1982, figaroa previously served as President of the Parliament of the Netherlands Antilles (1975-1976, 1979) and Minister of Education of the Netherlands Antilles (1961-1962), Figaroa also served as chairman of the Aruba Football Federation and chairman of the Netherlands Antilles Olympic Committee.

== Early life ==
Figaroa studied meer uitgebreid lager onderwijs at Saint Dominicus College in Oranjestad. He then worked for several months at Lago Oil and Transport Company. In 1944 he joined the civil service where he worked in administration at the Water and Energy Company Aruba for 5 years, after which he worked in administration and mortgages. In 1949 he got a diploma in English correspondence, in 1952 he followed a course in administration of buildings, and in 1957 he got a diploma in Spanish.

== Political career ==
From 1 June 1961 until 2 November 1962 Figaroa was Minister for Education of the Netherlands Antilles in the Second Jonckheer cabinet, for the Union Nacional Arubano (UNA). Afterwards from 1963 until 1967 he was a member of the Island council of Aruba.

In 1971, Movimiento Electoral di Pueblo (MEP) was created as a new political party on the island of Aruba. In the 1973, election the MEP gained 5 out of the 8 seats designated to Aruba in the parliament of the Netherlands Antilles, and became the largest party. As such in 1975 Figaroa was elected chairman of the parliament of the Netherlands Antilles. During his tenure Suriname, another country within the Kingdom of the Netherlands, became independent. Figaroa lead the envoy of Netherlands Antilles representatives during the Suriname independence debates in the Dutch House of Representatives. In preparation of these debates Figaroa hosted the chair of the Dutch House of Representatives, Anne Vondeling, and the chair of the parliament of Suriname, Emile Wijntuin, in September 1975, since the Netherlands Antilles was considered a neutral party in these discussions.

From 1979 until 1982, Figaroa was lieutenant governor of Aruba (Dutch: gezaghebber). The lieutenant governor of Aruba was the highest official on the island, and worked together with the governor of the Netherlands Antilles, who was stationed on the island of Curacao. The lieutenant governor was chair of the Island council and lead the islands executive office. He represented Aruba in court, was head of law enforcement, and represented both the Dutch government and the government of the Netherlands Antilles.

Queen Beatrix, together with her husband prince Claus, visited the Netherlands Antilles from 28 October until 8 November 1980, as her first official visit as queen. On 29 October they visited Aruba, where they were received by lieutenant governor Figaroa. The queen lay the first stone for the new National Library of Aruba and lent her name to the local airport, Queen Beatrix International Airport.

In 1986, Aruba seceded from the Netherlands Antilles and became a country within the Kingdom of the Netherlands. From 1986 until his death in 1993, Figaroa was a member of the newly created Advisory Council of Aruba. This council advises the Aruban government and parliament on cases of law and government.

Figaroa was a member of the Latin American Parliament, serving on the education, culture, science, technology and communication committee.

== Sports ==
Figaroa was founder of SV Jong Aruba, chair of the Aruba Football Federation and chair of the Netherlands Antilles Olympic Committee.

== Honours ==
In 1980, Figaroa was created an officer of the Order of Orange-Nassau. The Frans Figaroa sports complex (Papiamento: Centro Deportiva Frans Figaroa) in the city of Noord was named after him. At the sports complex stands a bust of Figaroa. A 6-kilometer part of the highway route 2 on Aruba was named after him, the Caya Frans Figaroa.

Government offices
Preceded by Francisco Jose Tromp	Lieutenant governor of Aruba; 1979–1982	Succeeded by Pedro Bislip
