= Minister Plenipotentiary of the Netherlands Antilles =

Former minister of government in the Netherlands

The minister plenipotentiary of the Netherlands Antilles (Dutch: Gevolmachtigd Minister van de Nederlandse Antillen) represented the constituent country of the Netherlands Antilles in the Council of Ministers of the Kingdom of the Netherlands. The minister plenipotentiary at the 2010 dissolution of the Netherlands Antilles was Marcel van der Plank. The minister plenipotentiary and his cabinet were seated in the "Antillenhuis" (Antilles House) in The Hague.

== List of ministers plenipotentiary ==
The following table lists the ministers plenipotentiary of Netherlands Antilles that have been in office until its dissolution.

No.	Portrait	Name	Tenure	Party	Ref.
1		Wem Lampe	1 August 1955 – 1 January 1967	Aruban Patriotic Party	
2		Efraïn Jonckheer	1968–1971	Democratic Party	
3		Boy Rozendal	12 February 1971 – 1 December 1975	Democratic Party	
4		Eldred Maduro	1 December 1975 – 1 December 1978	Independent	
5		Ronald Casseres	18 December 1979 – 1 October 1982	Partido MAN	
6		Richard Pieternella	1 October 1982 – 12 November 1982	Union Reformista Antillano	
7		Marco Jesus de Castro	12 November 1982 – 1 October 1984	Partido MAN	
8		Gualberto Hernandez	1 October 1984 – 7 June 1988	Democratic Party	
9		Edsel Jesurun	8 June 1988 – 30 March 1994	Union Reformista Antillano	
10		Carel de Haseth	30 March 1994 – 1 July 1998	Party for the Restructured Antilles	
11		Dito Mendes de Gouveia	1 July 1998 – 1 January 2000	Independent	
(10)		Carel de Haseth	1 January 2000 – 22 July 2003	Party for the Restructured Antilles	
12		Maurice Adriaens	22 July 2003 – 3 June 2004	Workers' Liberation Front	
(10)		Carel de Haseth	3 June 2004 – 23 July 2004	Party for the Restructured Antilles	
13		Paul Comenencia	23 July 2004 – 4 July 2009	Party for the Restructured Antilles	
14		Marcel van der Plank	4 July 2009 – 10 October 2010	Party for the Restructured Antilles	

== See also ==
- Prime Minister of the Netherlands Antilles
