= Maria Irausquin-Wajcberg =

Aruban politician

- Irausquin-Wajcberg at the opening of Saba Airport in 1964

Member of the Island Council
- In office 1963–1967

Personal details
- Born: 13 September 1897
- Died: 15 April 1979 (aged 81)

Maria Irausquin-Wajcberg (13 September 1897 – 15 April 1979) was an Aruban politician. In 1963 she became the first woman to be elected to Aruba Island Council.

== Biography ==
Irausquin-Wajcberg was married twice. She had two children with her first husband, Isaac Pinkus, with whom she ran a shop called Pinkus Store in San Nicolaas from the 1930s. She later married Juancho Irausquin (1905–1962), a prominent Aruban politician. At the time of his death in 1962, he was Minister of Finance and Welfare of the Netherlands Antilles and leader of the Aruban Patriotic Party (PPA).

In the 1963 Island Council elections, Irausquin-Wajcberg was the last-placed candidate on the PPA list, a slot usually reserved for prominent party members who do not expect to be elected. However, once preference votes were taken into account, she was elected to the Island Council, becoming its first female member. She did not stand for re-election in 1967, and subsequently retired from politics. She died in 1979 and was buried in the Jewish cemetery in Oranjestad.
