= John Horris Sprockel =

Netherlands Antillean politician (1892–1970)

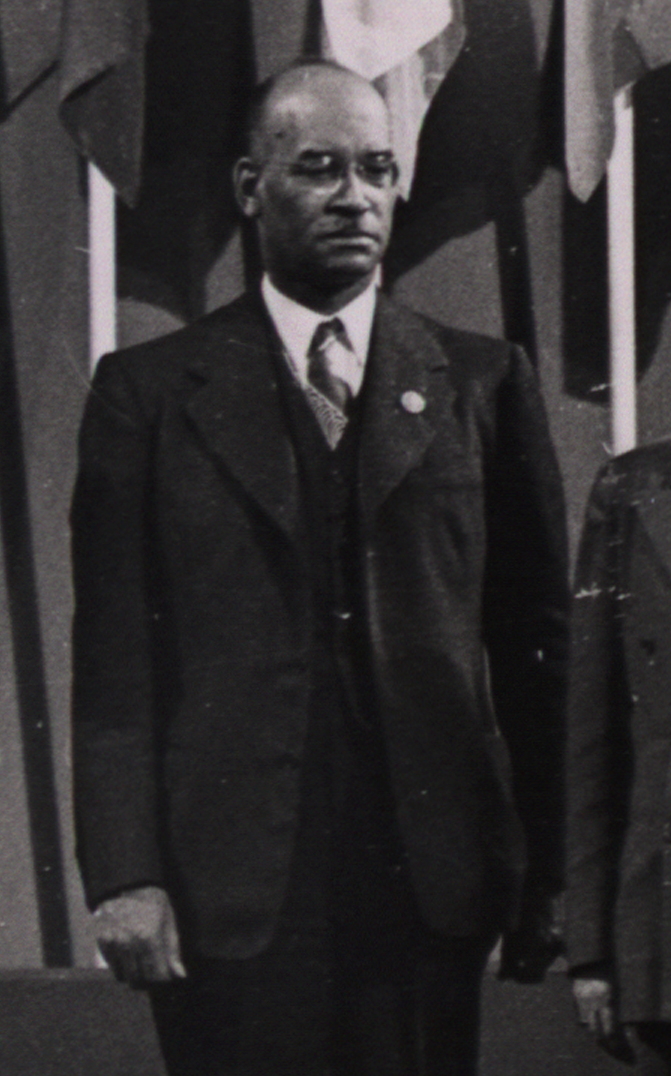
J.H. Sprockel (1945)

John Horris Sprockel (9 August 1892 – 8 April 1970) was politician of the Netherlands Antilles.

He was born on Curaçao as the son of Cornelis Colonis Sprockel and Helena Paulina Antersijn. He went to the Netherlands in 1904 to study in Den Bosch to become a teacher at an elementary school. After working as a teacher in Tilburg, he returned to Curaçao in 1916 and he started teaching at the Hendrikschool. From 1925 he was in the Netherlands for two years to receive further education. In 1931 he was appointed head of the Hendrikschool. A year later, Governor Slobbe appointed him to the Koloniale Raad (parliament), succeeding R.J. Beaujon. Sprockel became in 1938 one of five members appointed by the governor while the other ten members were elected. After the election in 1941 he became an elected member of the Estates (successor to the Koloniale Raad) and he has also been its speaker. Furthermore, like Moises Frumencio da Costa Gomez, he was a member of the Curaçaoan Roman Catholic Party (CRKP). That party fell apart around 1948, with Da Costa Gomez continuing with the National People's Party (NVP) and Sprockel with the Catholic People's Party (KVP). In the elections at the end of 1950, the KVP received 2 seats. Sprockel became Minister of Education and Public Development and in 1953 also Minister of the Interior. The KVP left the cabinet around March 1954. Sprockel died in 1970 at the age of 77.

In Willemstad, the capital city of Curaçao, there is a street called after him: Kaya John Horris Sprockel.
