= Marcel van der Plank =

Dutch politician

Marcel van der Plank (born 10 March 1951) was the Minister Plenipotentiary of the Netherlands Antilles, until its dissolution in 2010. He was appointed in 2009, and succeeded Paul Comenencia, who stepped down after being appointed Consul General in Rio de Janeiro.

Van der Plank was born on 10 March 1951 in Curaçao. He studied Notary Law in Utrecht and graduated in 1973. He practised as a notary in Curaçao from 1978. Van der Plank was one of the founders of the Real Alternative Party. After the dissolution of the Netherlands Antilles, he became chairman of Stichting Monumentenzorg Curaçao, the monument trust of Curaçao. He retired in 2021, because there was a ten year limit in the statues of the foundation.

Van der Plank is married and has three sons.
