= Wem Lampe =

Politician of the Netherlands Antilles (1896–1973)

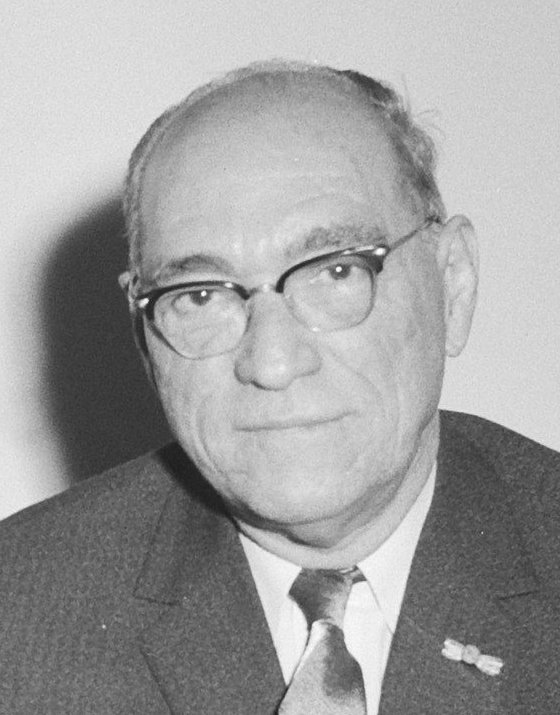
- W.F.M. Lampe (1960)

Minister of Justice
- In office April 1951 – July 1952
- In office November 1954 – August 1955

Minister Plenipotentiary
- In office 1 August 1955 – 1 January 1967
- Preceded by: position established
- Succeeded by: Efraïn Jonckheer

Personal details
- Born: Willem Frederik Meinhardt Lampe; 5 December 1896 Aruba
- Died: 21 February 1973 (aged 76) Oranjestad, Aruba
- Party: Aruban Patriotic Party
- Profession: Politician, lawyer

Willem Frederik Meinhardt (Wem) Lampe (5 December 1896 – 21 February 1973) was a politician of the Netherlands Antilles. Lampe served as Minister of Justice from 1951 to 1952, and from 1954 to 1955. He was Minister Plenipotentiary from 1955 to 1967.

== Biography ==
Lampe was born in Aruba as the son of Hendrik Meinhardt Lampe and Sofia Romelia Zeppenfeldt. His father was a teacher and died when Wem was 6 years old. Wem Lampe was a shop assistant and left in 1914 for the island of Sint Maarten. There he attended secondary school at the same school where his eldest brother was headmaster. In addition to that education, he worked at the office of the lieutenant governor A.J.C. Brouwer.

In 1917 Lampe became registrar of the Council of Justice on Sint Eustatius and from 1921 he was the acting lieutenant governor of Saba. Six years later, he was appointed Lieutenant Governor of the SSS islands (Sint Maarten, Sint Eustatius and Saba). In 1930 he went to Curaçao where he became head of the Accountability Department at the Department of Finance. Shortly afterwards he went to work at the prosecutor general's office. In addition, he was twice in the Netherlands for a law study, after which he took exams for a 'praktizijn' (lawyer) and notary. He was an official of the Public Prosecution Service at the cantonal court in Curaçao before he was appointed Public Prosecutor in the middle of 1941. In 1946 he left the government service and settled as a notary in Aruba.

He became Minister of Justice in April 1951 but resigned in July 1952. After the election of 1954 Lampe was again appointed Minister of Justice. In August 1955, he was appointed as first Minister Plenipotentiary of the Netherlands Antilles in The Hague, and served until 1 January 1967. After that he was Deputy Governor until June 1970.

Lampe died in 1973 in Oranjestad, Aruba, at the age of 76.
