= 1951 Netherlands Antilles island council elections =

Island council elections were held in the Netherlands Antilles in 1951. They were the first elections for the Island Council, and followed the establishment of the Island Councils of the Netherlands Antilles through the Islands Regulation of the Netherlands Antilles (ERNA).

== Aruba ==
General elections were held in Aruba in June 1951. Five parties participated: the Aruban People's Party, the Aruban Patriotic Party, the Aruba Independence Party and – following a split in 1949 – a Catholic and Protestant branch of the Aruba National Union.

=== Results ===
Party	Votes	%	Seats
Aruban People's Party	4,510	35.32	8
Aruban Patriotic Party	4,445	34.81	8
Aruba National Union I	1,866	14.61	3
Aruba National Union II	1,430	11.20	2
Aruba Independence Party	519	4.06	0
Total	12,770	100.00	21
Registered voters/turnout	14,558	–	
Source: Official Newsletter, Historia di Aruba

== Sint Maarten ==
General elections were held in Sint Maarten on 4 June 1951, the island's first elections based on universal suffrage. The result was a victory for the National People's Party, which won four of the five Island Council seats.

=== Results ===
Party	Votes	%	Seats
National People's Party	357	72.56	4
Democratic Party	135	27.44	1
Total	492	100.00	5
Valid votes	492	95.91	
Invalid/blank votes	21	4.09	
Total votes	513	100.00	
Registered voters/turnout	599	85.64	
Source: Lynch & Lynch
