= Piet Kasteel =

Dutch journalist, diplomat and colonial administrator (1901-2003)

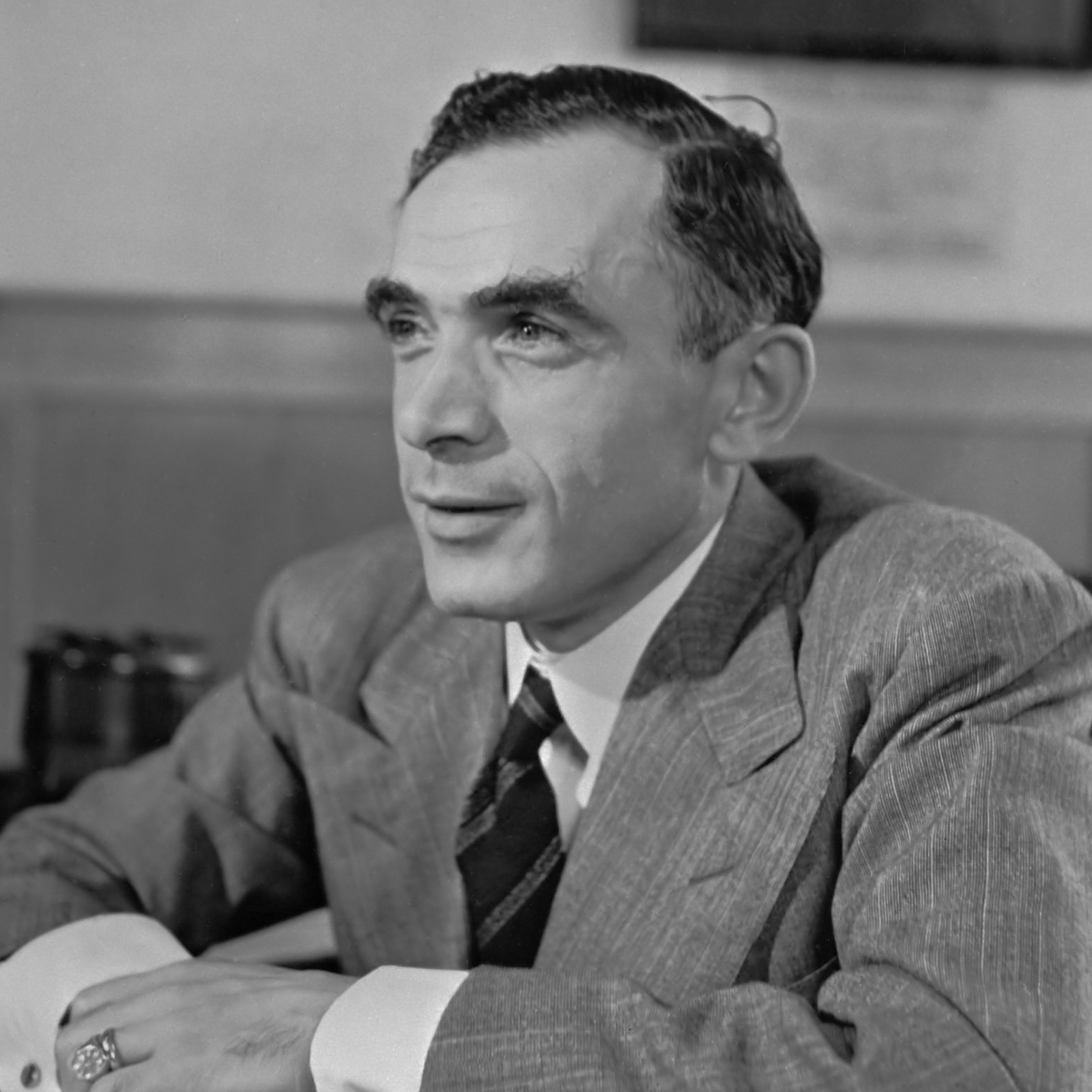
- Kasteel (1942)

Ambassadors of the Netherlands to Ireland
- In office March 1956 – 1966

Ambassadors of the Netherlands to Chile
- In office 1948–1956

Governor of Curaçao and Dependencies
- In office 15 July 1942 – 4 August 1948
- Preceded by: Gielliam Wouters
- Succeeded by: Leonard Antoon Peters

Personal details
- Born: Petrus Albertus Kasteel; 4 November 1901 Zwolle, Netherlands
- Died: 13 December 2003 (aged 102) Rome, Italy
- Occupation: journalist, diplomat and colonial administrator

Petrus Albertus "Piet" Kasteel (4 November 1901 – 13 December 2003) was a Dutch journalist, diplomat, and colonial administrator. He was parliamentary editor of De Maasbode, and fled to England during World War II where he served for the Dutch government-in-exile. He served as Governor of Curaçao and Dependencies from 15 July 1942 until 4 August 1948, Dutch Ambassador to Chile (1948–1956), to Ireland (1956–1964) and three years to Israel (1964-1967).

== Biography ==
Kasteel was born on 4 November 1901 in Zwolle, Netherlands. His family always belonged to the Catholic Church. In 1923, he moved to Amsterdam, where he became a journalist for De Tijd, and founded the Catholic association De Klare Waarheid. In October 1929, he became parliamentary editor of De Maasbode, then the largest Catholic newspaper in the Netherlands. In 1938, he received his doctorate in political and social sciences from KU Leuven on a biography of prime minister Abraham Kuyper.

On 14 May 1940, after the German invasion of the Netherlands, Kasteel as a known anti-fascist was officially counselled to board a fishing boat, his wife and children remaining behind, and he arrived in England two days later. His services were required by the Dutch government-in-exile under the nom de guerre "Chateauneuf du Pape". He was appointed to the Ministry of Justice, headed by his friend Pieter Sjoerds Gerbrandy. In September 1940, Gerbandy became Prime Minister-in-exile, and appointed Kasteel as his chief of cabinet and personal secretary.

On 15 July 1942, Kasteel was installed as Governor of Curaçao and Dependencies. In 1947 negotiations started for political autonomy of Curaçao and Dependencies. The island of Aruba no longer wanted remain subordinate to Curaçao, and demonstrations were organised. In January 1948, the delegations of Aruba and Curaçao demanded but did not obtain the resignation of Kasteel. In June 1948, at the end of his term, Kasteel announced his resignation, and left on 4 August 1948.

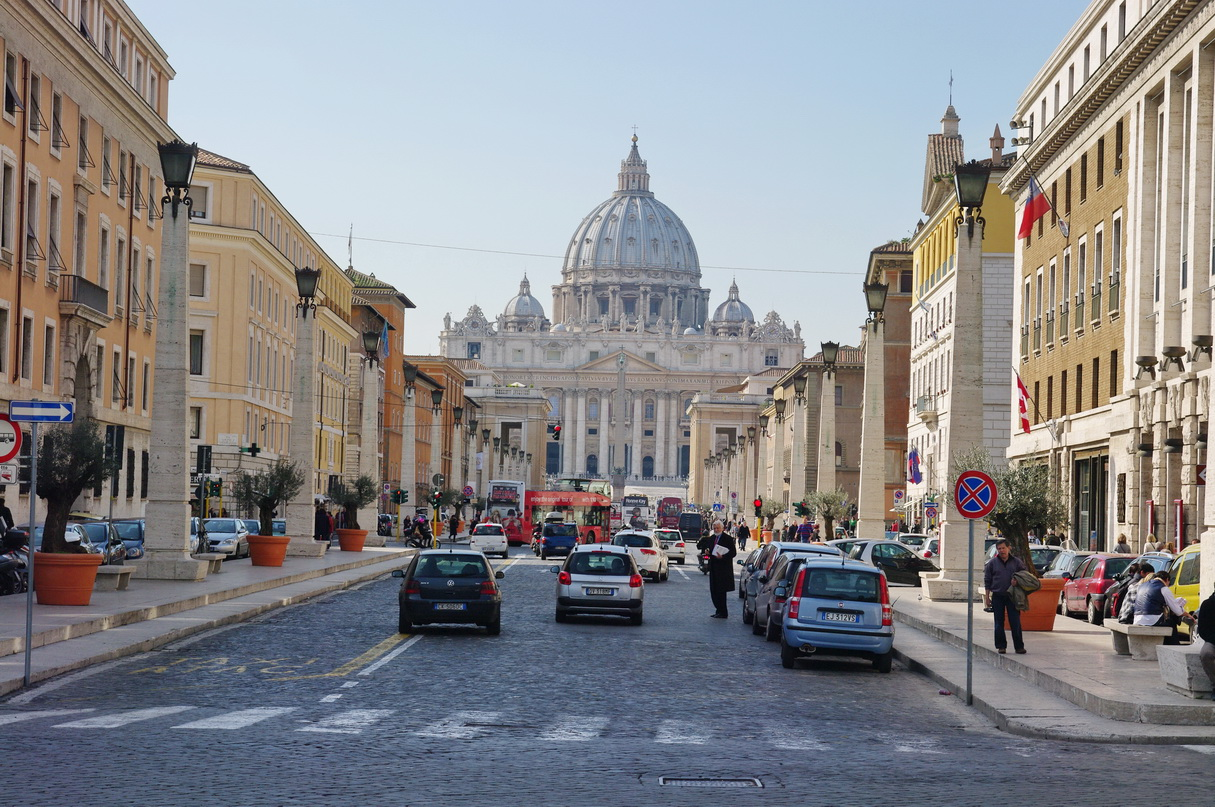
Via della Conciliazione, Rome

Kasteel was appointed Ambassador of the Netherlands to Chile, and served until 1956, In March 1956, he was appointed Ambassador to Ireland, and served until 1964. He served for three years as Ambassador to Israel, and retired in December 1966. After retiring, Kasteel moved to Via della Conciliazione in Rome, Italy near the Vatican where his son Karel served in the Apostolic Camera.

On 13 December 2003, Kasteel died in Rome, at the age of 102.

== Honours ==
- Netherlands Knight of the Order of the Netherlands Lion.
- France Commander in the Legion of Honour.
- Brazil Order of the Southern Cross.
- United States Medal of Freedom with Silver Palm.
- Vatican Knight in the Order of the Holy Sepulchre.
