= Efraïn Jonckheer =

Politician of the Netherlands Antilles

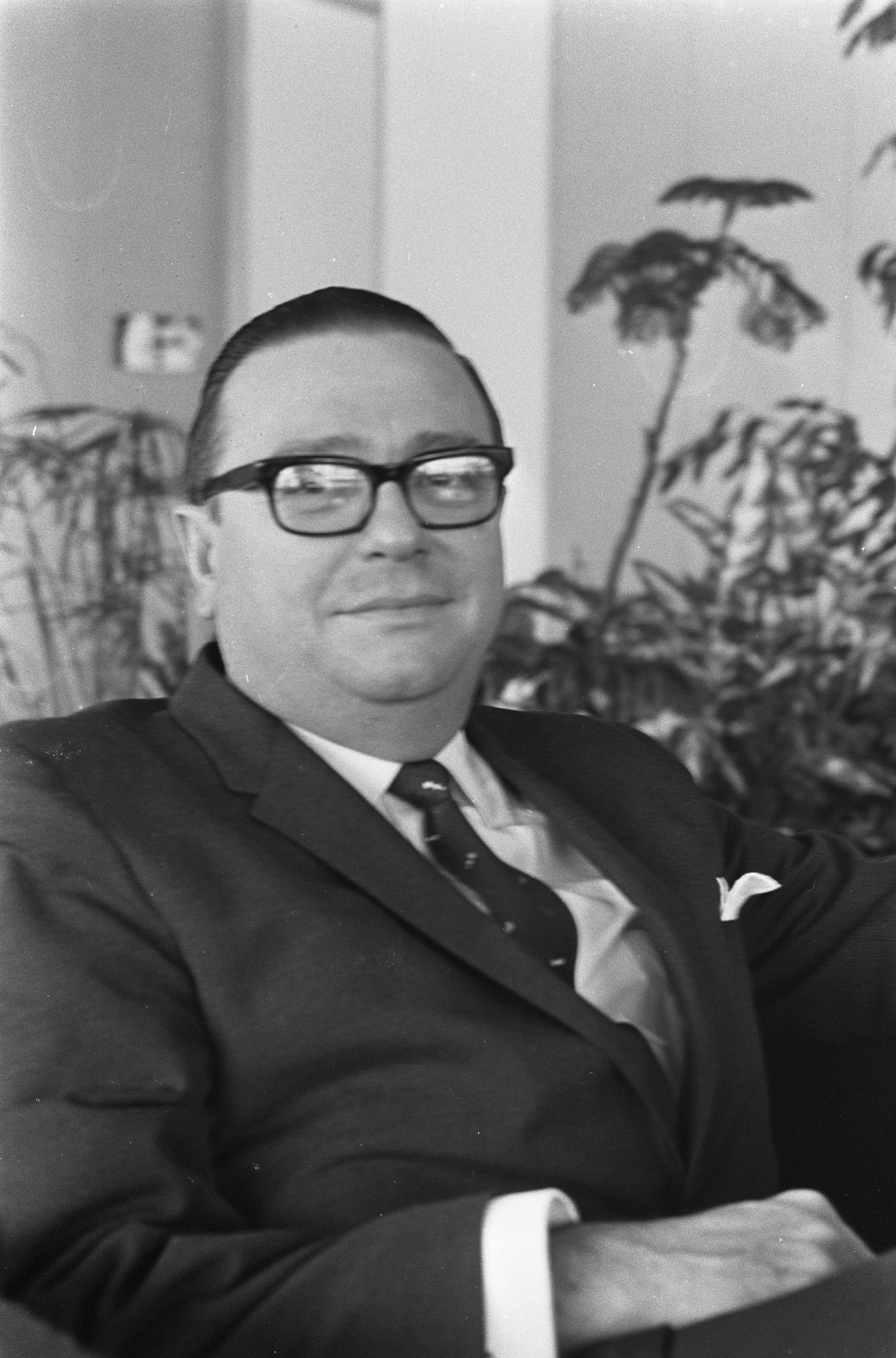
- Jonckheer (1967)

Prime Minister of the Netherlands Antilles
- In office 8 November 1954 – 14 February 1968
- Monarch: Queen Juliana
- Preceded by: Moises da Costa Gomez
- Succeeded by: Ciro Kroon

Minister Plenipotentiary of the Netherlands Antilles
- In office 1968–1971
- Preceded by: Wem Lampe
- Succeeded by: Boy Rozendal

Personal details
- Born: 20 October 1917 Curaçao, Curaçao and Dependencies
- Died: 30 March 1987 (aged 69) Amsterdam, Netherlands
- Party: Democratic Party
- Occupation: business owner, politician

Efraïn Jonckheer (20 October 1917 – 30 March 1987) was a businessman and politician of the Netherlands Antilles. Jonckheer served as Prime Minister of the Netherlands Antilles from 8 November 1954 until 14 February 1968. He served as Minister Plenipotentiary of the Netherlands Antilles from 1968 until 1971, Ambassador of the Netherlands to Venezuela from 1971 until 1976, and to Costa Rica from 1976 until 1982. As of 2022, Jonckheer was the longest-serving prime minister in the history of the Kingdom of the Netherlands. (Note: The Kingdom of the Netherlands is defined as the Netherlands, the former Netherlands Antilles and her successors Aruba, Curaçao and Sint Maarten as well as Suriname until 1975.)

== Biography ==
Jonckheer was born on 20 October 1917 in Curaçao. In 1933, he obtained his mulo (junior high school) diploma, and became director of several businesses. During World War II, he became politically active, and desired autonomy for the islands. In 1944, he was one of the founders of the Democratic Party, and was elected to chair the party.

In 1945, Jonckheer was first elected to the Estates of the Netherlands Antilles. In 1948 and 1952 until 1954, he was the representative of the Netherlands Antilles in the Round Table Conference about the future of the Dutch empire.

On 8 November 1954, Jonckheer was elected Prime Minister of the Netherlands Antilles. On 15 November, he signed the Charter for the Kingdom of the Netherlands which resulted in the Netherlands Antilles becoming a constituent country within the Kingdom of the Netherlands. Jonckheer would serve until 14 February 1968 when he was succeeded by Ciro Kroon. He would subsequently serve as Minister Plenipotentiary of the Netherlands Antilles until 1971.

In 1969, Jonckheer was nominated by the Estates of Netherlands Antilles as successor of Cola Debrot as Governor of Netherlands Antilles, however the Council of Ministers voted against the nomination.

In March 1971, Jonkcheer was appointed Ambassador of the Netherlands to Venezuela, and served until 1976. In 1976, he became Ambassador of the Netherlands to Costa Rica, and served until 1982 with an accreditation as non-resident to Panama and Nicaragua

On 30 March 1987 Jonkcheer died in Amsterdam, at the age of 69.

== Honours ==
- Honorary doctorate in law at the Vrije Universiteit Amsterdam (1965).
- Netherlands Commander of the Order of the Netherlands Lion.
- Netherlands Commander of the Order of Orange-Nassau.
- Panama Grand Officer of the Order of Vasco Núñez de Balboa.

On 15 December 1994, a statue of Jonkcheer was revealed on the Rif Fort in Otrobanda, Curaçao.

== See also ==
- First Jonckheer cabinet
- Second Jonckheer cabinet
- Third Jonckheer cabinet
- Jonckheer-Kroon cabinet
