= Henny Eman (born 1887) =

Aruban politician

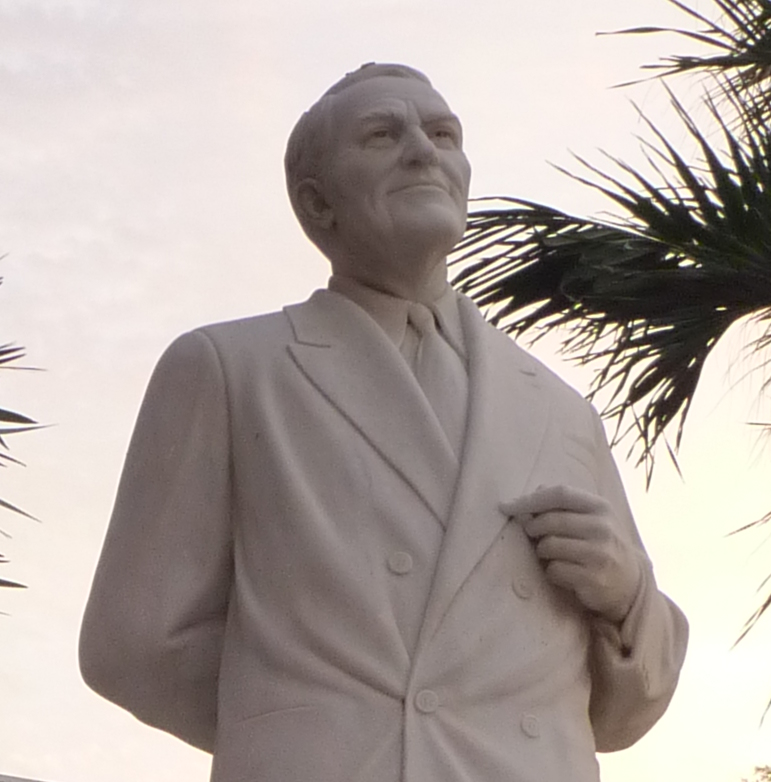
- Statue of Henny Eman in Oranjestad, next to Parliament

Member of Parliament of the Netherlands Antilles
- In office 1954 – 17 October 1957

Member of Parliament of Curaçao
- In office 1941–1954

Member of the Island Council of Aruba
- In office 1922–1941

Personal details
- Born: Jan Hendrik Albert Eman; 7 August 1887 Aruba
- Died: 17 October 1957 (aged 70) Aruba
- Party: Aruban People's Party

Jan Hendrik Albert "Henny" Eman (7 August 1887 – 17 October 1957) was an Aruban politician and founder of the Aruban People's Party who led the movement for Aruba's autonomy from Curaçao. His grandson went on to become the first Prime Minister of Aruba.

== Biography ==
Henny Eman was born on 7 August 1887 in Aruba. In 1921, he became a member of the Aruba Court of Policy. In 1922, he was elected to the Council of State, a governing body which was subservient to the Colonial Council of Curaçao. The number of voters for the Council of State was severely limited: in 1931, Eman was re-elected with 144 votes.

In 1931, Eman was one of the petitioners to the States General of the Netherlands asking for more autonomy for Aruba. In 1937, the Colonial Council of Curaçao was dissolved and replaced by the Parliament of Curaçao, however Curaçao and the Netherlands were still firmly in control. Of the 15 members, 5 were appointed by the Governor, 6 were from Curaçao, 2 from Aruba, 1 from Bonaire and 1 from the SSS islands.

In 1941, Eman was elected to Parliament. He firmly defended the interests of Aruba, and advocated Separación, seceding from Curaçao and Dependencies, but maintaining links to the Netherlands. In 1942, Eman founded the Aruban People's Party (AVP). On 6 December 1942, Queen Wilhelmina of the Netherlands made a speech about the need for reorganization and democratization of the colonies. The speech was intended to keep Indonesia inside the empire, however it was considered revolutionary in Suriname and in Aruba.

Eman advocated for an equal number of representation for Aruba, and participated in the round table conferences about the future of the Kingdom. In 1947, Eman organized a petition to secede from Curaçao and Dependencies and become an autonomous region of the Kingdom of the Netherlands. In 1949 both Aruba and Curaçao were given 8 seats.

In 1951, the Aruba Court of Policy was disbanded and replaced by an Island Council who were in charge of the local administration of the island. In 1952, the number of seats for Curaçao was increased to 12 while Aruba remained at 8. In 1954, the Charter for the Kingdom of the Netherlands came into effect making the Netherlands Antilles a constituent country within the Kingdom of the Netherlands. In 1955, the AVP lost the majority seats to the Aruban Patriotic Party (PPA) who advocated a more moderate course.

Eman died on 17 October 1957 at the age of 70. In 1972, a statue was erected on Henny Eman Plaza near the Parliament building of Aruba. During his tenure, Eman enacted projects such as the Oranjestad Harbor, then Princess-Beatrix International Airport and several roads and schools.
