= Moises Frumencio da Costa Gomez =

Netherlands Antillean politician (1907–1966)

Moises da Costa Gomez
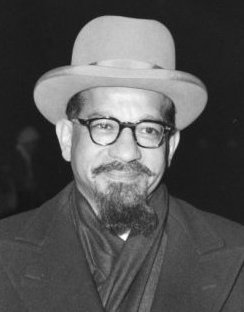
- Da Costa Gomez in 1960

1st Prime Minister of the Netherlands Antilles
- In office 18 April 1951 – 15 December 1954
- Monarch: Juliana
- Preceded by: Office established
- Succeeded by: Efraïn Jonckheer

Personal details
- Born: 27 October 1907; Otrobanda, Curaçao, Curaçao and Dependencies
- Died: 22 November 1966 (aged 59); Willemstad, Curaçao, Netherlands Antilles
- Political party: National People's Party
- Spouse: Lucina da Costa Gomez

Moises Frumencio da Costa Gomez (27 October 1907 – 22 November 1966) was the president of the first Governing Council of the Netherlands Antilles and the first Prime Minister of the Netherlands Antilles.

== Biography ==
Da Costa Gomez was born on 27 October 1907 in Curaçao. At the age of 15, he was given a scholarship to the Netherlands. In 1932, he graduated his law studies at the Radboud University Nijmegen. In 1935, he received his doctorate at the University of Amsterdam.

Da Costa Gomez was, like John Horris Sprockel, a member of the Roman Catholic Party. He founded the National People's Party in the 1940s. Da Costa Gomez was president of the first Governing Council (Regeringsraad) at the head of a coalition government with the Aruban People's Party (AVP) from 1951 to 1954, and is often referred to as the first Prime Minister of the Netherlands Antilles.

His party negotiated full autonomy at the 1954 Roundtable Conference, involving the Netherlands and Suriname. Following the 1954 elections, the Democratic Party took over governing the Netherlands Antilles. Da Costa Gomez remained the leader of the National People's Party; he was succeeded in leadership by Juan Evertsz after his death in 1966.

Da Costa Gomez's doctoral thesis called for self-government and universal suffrage and inspired his followers as well as the Roman Catholic Party. Reforms led by Gomez led to legalization of tambú music parties in 1952. In 1973 a statue of the statesman was unveiled in the center of the Curaçao capital Willemstad.

He is buried in a monument at the Morada Santa in Bottelier.

Political offices
Preceded by Office established	Prime Minister of the Netherlands Antilles; 1951–1954	Succeeded by Efraïn F. Jonckheer
