= Parliament of the Netherlands Antilles =

Parliament of the Netherlands Antilles Staten van de Nederlandse Antillen Parlamento di Antias Hulandes

History
- Founded: 5 April 1938
- Disbanded: 10 October 2010
- Preceded by: Colonial Council of Curaçao and Dependencies
- Succeeded by: Parliament of Aruba; Parliament of Curaçao; Parliament of Sint Maarten; States General of the Netherlands
- Seats: 15 (1938–1949); 21 (1949–1950); 22 (1950–2010)

Elections
- Last election: 22 January 2010

Motto
- Cum lege libertas (Latin) "With the law there is freedom"

Meeting place
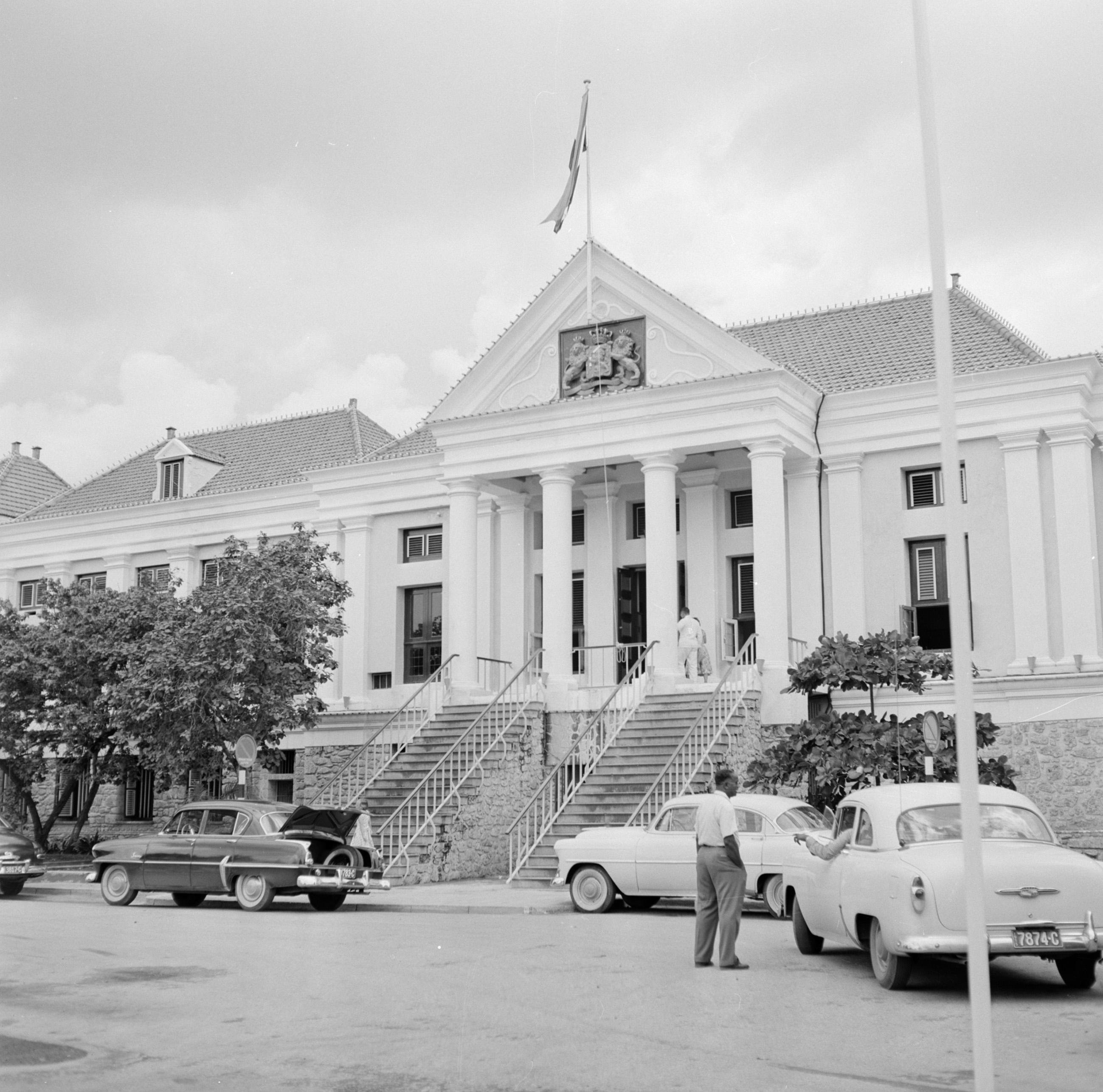
- Statengebouw, Wilhelminaplein, Willemstad

The Parliament of the Netherlands Antilles (Dutch: Staten van de Nederlandse Antillen; Papiamento: Parlamento di Antias Hulandes), also translated as the Estates of the Netherlands Antilles, was the parliament of the Netherlands Antilles. It comprised 22 members, elected for a four-year term in three multi-seat constituencies and two single-seat constituencies. On 10 October 2010, the Netherlands Antilles were dissolved, and so was the parliament.

== History ==
On 20 December 1937, the first parliamentary election took place following the reorganization of the Colonial Council of Curaçao and Dependencies. The first Parliament of the Netherlands Antilles consisted of 15 members, of whom 5 were appointed by the Governor of the Netherlands Antilles and 10 were elected in elections held in the territories. In 1949, universal suffrage was introduced and parliament grew from 15 to 21 seats. From 1950, the Parliament had 22 members, elected by proportional representation for a term of 4 years.

The Parliament received subsequent criticism for the way it allocated representation, with it being viewed by academics that the smaller islands in the Netherlands Antilles were overrepresented. It was also felt that the attempt to create an Antillian identity in the Dutch Caribbean was similar to the British attempt with the West Indies Federation.

== Seats ==
Number of seats by constituency
| Constituency | Timespan | | | | |
| Constituency | 1938–1945 | 1945–1949 | 1949–1950 | 1950–1985 | 1986–2010 |
|---|---|---|---|---|---|
| Aruba | 2 | 3 | 8 | 8 | – |
| Bonaire | 1 | 1 | 2 | 1 | 3 |
| Curaçao | 6 | 5 | 8 | 12 | 14 |
| Windward Islands | 1 | 1 | – | 1 | – |
| Saba | – | – | 1 | – | 1 |
| Sint Eustatius | – | – | 1 | – | 1 |
| Sint Maarten | – | – | 1 | – | 3 |
| Appointed members | 5 | 5 | – | – | – |
| Total | 15 | 15 | 21 | 22 | 22 |

== List of presidents ==
Following the 1937 general election, the Members of the Parliament of the Netherlands Antilles elected J.H. Sprockel as the first president of the Parliament. The last person to hold this position was Pedro Atacho (2007–2010).

Presidents of the Parliament of the Netherlands Antilles
| No. | Name | Term of office | Party | Constituency |
|---|---|---|---|---|
| 1 | J.H. Sprockel | 1938-1945 | CKP | Curaçao |
| 2 | A.W. Desertine | 1945-1947 | CKP | Curaçao |
| 3 | E.A. Römer | 1947-1949 | CKP | Curaçao |
| 4 | J.E. Yrausquin | 1949-1950 | PPA | Aruba |
| 5 | W.R. Plantz | 1950-1951 | – | Windward Islands |
| 6 | J.C. Debrol | 1951-1952 | KVP | Curaçao |
| 7 | P. Cohen Henriquez | 1952-1953 | NVP | Curaçao |
| 8 | J.E. Yrausquin | 1954-1956 | PPA | Aruba |
| 9 | R.J. Isa | 1956-1959 | DP | Curaçao |
| 10 | J.A.O. Bikker | 1959-1966 | DP | Curaçao |
| 11 | O.R.A. Beaujon | 1966-1968 | DP | Curaçao |
| 12 | L.A. Abraham | 1968-1969 | PDB | Bonaire |
| 13 | C.E. Cathalina | 1969-1971 | DP | Curaçao |
| 14 | F.L. Maduro | 1971-1973 | PRO | Aruba |
| 15 | R. Elhage | 1973-1975 | PSD | Curaçao |
| 16 | F.D. Figaroa | 1975-1976 | MEP | Aruba |
| 17 | A. Nita | 1976-1977 | FOL | Curaçao |
| 18 | J.A.O. Bikker | 1977-1979 | DP | Curaçao |
| 19 | F.D. Figaroa | 1979 | MEP | Aruba |
| 20 | G.F. Croes | 1979-1980 | MEP | Aruba |
| 21 | P. Bislip | 1980-1982 | ADN | Aruba |
| 22 | R.A.E. Markes | 1982 | MAN | Example |
| 23 | R. Lopez Henriquez | 1983 | AVP | Aruba |
| 24 | R.A.E. Markes | 1984-1985 | MAN | Curaçao |
| 25 | J.A.O. Bikker | 1986-1988 | DP | Curaçao |
| 26 | E.A.V. Jesrun | 1988 | NVP | Curaçao |
| 27 | H. Thomas | 1988-1990 | NVP | Curaçao |
| 28 | R.F. McWilliam | 1990-1993 | NVP | Curaçao |
| 29 | D.A.S. Lucia | 1993-1994 | FOL | Curaçao |
| 30 | L.A. George-Wout | 1994-1998 | PAR | Curaçao |
| 31 | E.A. Cova | 1998-1999 | PLKP | Curaçao |
| 32 | D.A.S. Lucia | 2001-2005 | FOL | Curaçao |
| 33 | D.E. Puriel | 2006 | MAN | Curaçao |
| 34 | R.J. Francisca | 2006-2007 | MAN | Curaçao |
| 35 | P.J. Atacho | 2007-2010 | PAR | Curaçao |
