= Colony of Curaçao and Dependencies =

1815–1954 Dutch colony in the Caribbean

Colony of Curaçao and Dependencies (1815–1828, 1845–1936) Kolonie Curaçao en Onderhorigheden (Dutch) Kolonia di Kòrsou i Dependensianan (Papiamento) Territory of Curaçao (1936–1948) Gebiedsdeel Curaçao (Dutch) Teritorio di Kòrsou (Papiamento) Netherlands Antilles (1948–1954) Nederlandse Antillen (Dutch) Antias Hulandes (Papiamento)
- 1634–1954
- Flag Coat of arms
- Anthem: "Wilhelmus van Nassouwe" (Dutch) "'William of Nassau"
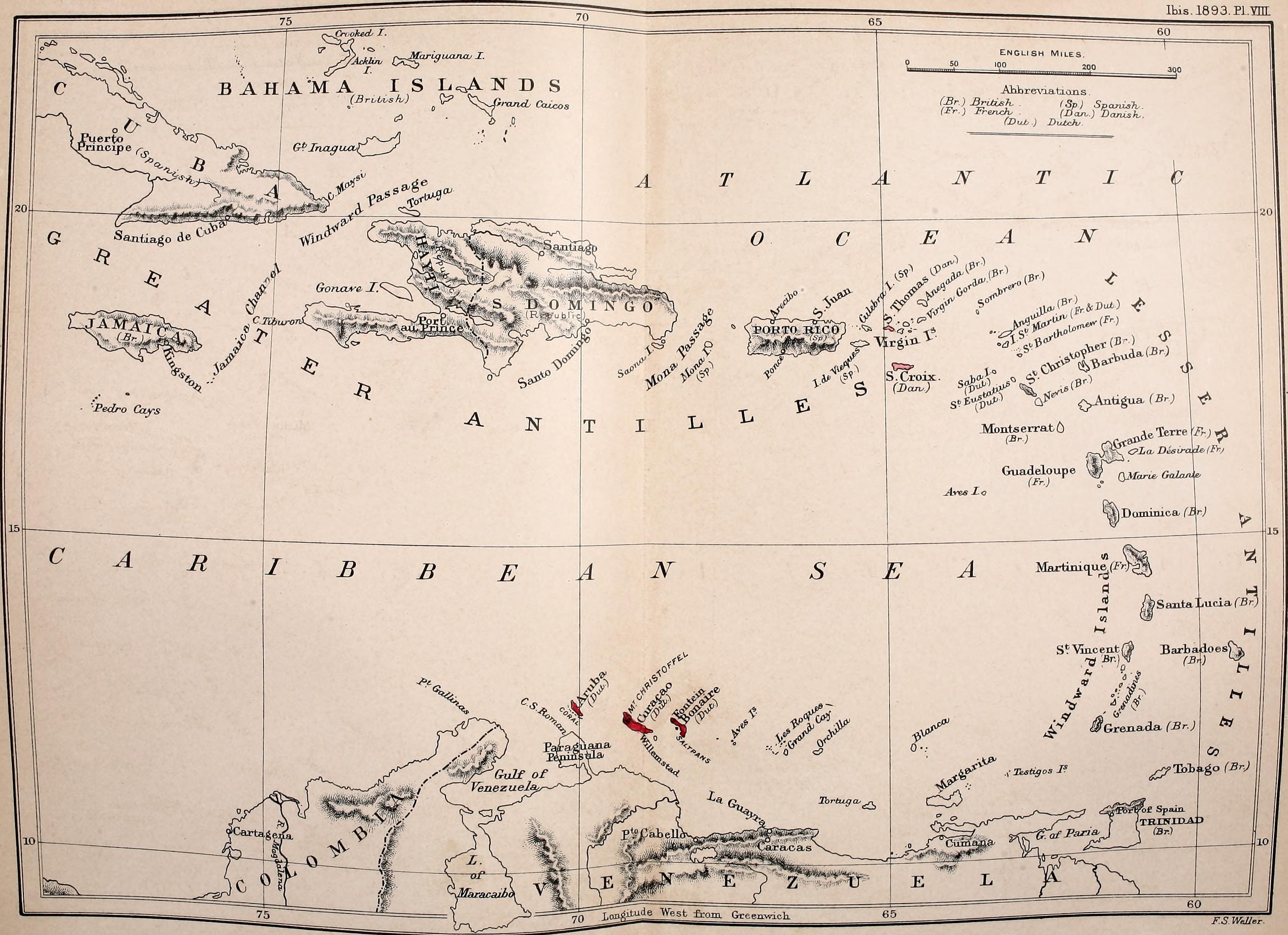
- Map of the Caribbean, 1893. Aruba, Curaçao and Bonaire are shaded in red.
- Status: Dutch colony
- Capital: Willemstad
- Common languages: Papiamento, Dutch, English
- History
  - Established: 1634
  - Anglo-Dutch Treaty: 13 August 1814
  - Constitution of the Netherlands: 24 August 1815
  - Proclamation of the Kingdom charter: 10 December 1954

Area
  - Total: 980 km^{2} (380 sq mi)
Preceded by	Succeeded by
Spanish West Indies	Netherlands Antilles
- Today part of: Aruba; Curaçao; Sint Maarten; Caribbean Netherlands

The Colony of Curaçao and Dependencies (Dutch: Kolonie Curaçao en Onderhorigheden; Papiamento: Kolonia di Kòrsou i Dependensianan) was a Dutch colony in the Caribbean Sea from 1634 until 1828 and from 1845 until 1954. Between 1936 and 1948, the area was officially known as the Territory of Curaçao (Dutch: Gebiedsdeel Curaçao; Papiamento: Teritorio di Kòrsou), and after 1948 as the Netherlands Antilles. With the proclamation of the Charter for the Kingdom of the Netherlands on 15 December 1954, the Netherlands Antilles attained equal status with the Netherlands proper and Suriname in the new Kingdom of the Netherlands.

== History ==
Under the terms of the Anglo-Dutch Treaty of 1814, the Netherlands regained control over its West Indies colonies, with the exception of Demerara, Essequibo, and Berbice. In the newly established United Kingdom of the Netherlands, these colonies were organized in the following way until 1828:

Name	Capital	Comprised
Curaçao and Dependencies	Willemstad	Curaçao, Aruba, Bonaire
Sint Eustatius and Dependencies	Oranjestad	Sint Eustatius, Sint Maarten, Saba
Surinam	Paramaribo	Suriname

As a cost-reducing measure, the three colonies were merged into a single West Indies colony ruled from Paramaribo, Suriname, in 1828. This proved to be an unhappy arrangement, causing it to be partially reverted in 1845. Sint Eustatius did not regain its status as a separate colony, however, and came to be ruled from Willemstad, Curaçao:

Name	Capital	Comprised
Curaçao and Dependencies	Willemstad	Curaçao, Aruba, Bonaire, Sint Eustatius, Sint Maarten, Saba
Surinam	Paramaribo	Suriname

== Politics ==
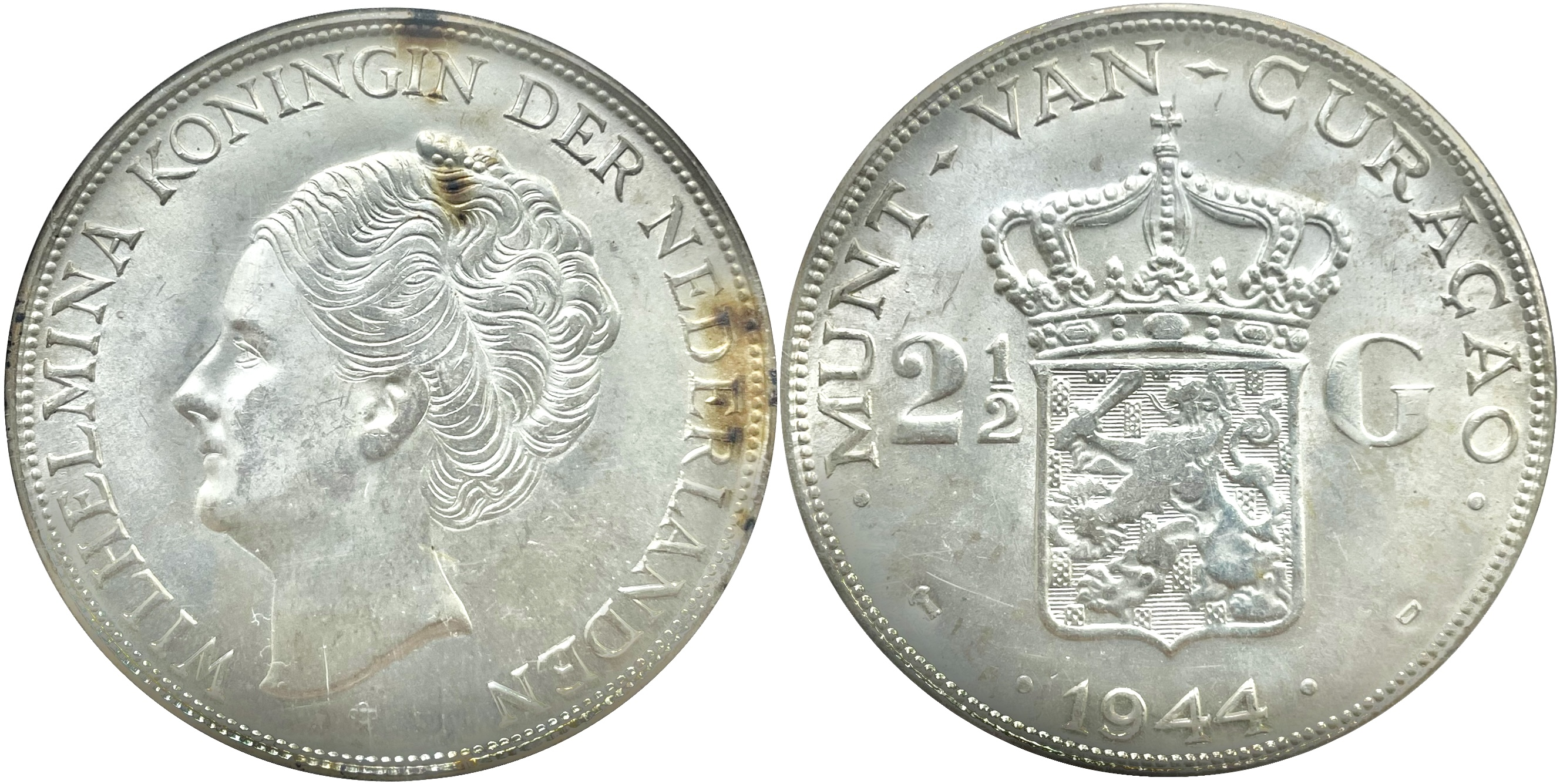
Silver coin: 2½ gulden Wilhelmina, Curaçao - 1944

Between 1833 and 1938, there was a Colonial Council which was an advisory body of the Colony of Curaçao and predecessor of the States of the Netherlands Antilles. The Colonial Council was established to assist the Governor of the Colony of Curaçao and its members were appointed by the King of the Netherlands . It was based in Curaçao. In 1865, Curaçao's government regulation (Dutch: Regeringsreglement voor Curaçao en onderhorige eilanden) was altered to allow for a limited autonomy for the colony. The structure established in this regulation remained in force until 1936, when the first Constitution of Curaçao was enacted. This new basic law followed on a revision of the Dutch constitution in 1922, in which all references to "colony" were deleted. In the new parliament established in the colony, the Estates of Curaçao, ten out of fifteen members were elected by popular vote, with the remaining five being appointed by the governor. Only about 5% of the population of both colonies was allowed to vote in the elections.

=== Gradual decolonization ===
The reforms in the government structure of the colony until the Second World War were largely superficial, and thus Curaçao continued to be governed as a colony. This changed after the conclusion of the Second World War. Queen Wilhelmina had promised in a 1942 speech to offer autonomy to the overseas territories of the Netherlands, and British and American occupation—with consent by the Dutch government—of the islands during the war led to increasing demands for autonomy within the population as well.

In May 1948, a new constitution for the territory entered into force, allowing the largest amount of autonomy allowed under the Dutch constitution of 1922. Among other things, universal suffrage was introduced. The territory was renamed to "Netherlands Antilles" as well. After the Dutch constitution was revised in 1948, a new interim Constitution of the Netherlands Antilles was enacted in February 1951. Shortly thereafter, on 3 March 1951, the Island Regulation of the Netherlands Antilles (Dutch: Eilandenregeling Nederlandse Antillen or ERNA; Papiamento: Regulashon Insular delas Antias Hulandes or RIAH) was issued by royal decree, giving fairly substantial autonomy to the various island territories in the Netherlands Antilles. A consolidated version of this regulation remained in force until the dissolution of the Netherlands Antilles in 2010.

The new constitution was only deemed an interim arrangement, as negotiations for a Charter for the Kingdom were already underway. On 15 December 1954, the Netherlands Antilles, Suriname, and the Netherlands acceded as equal partners to an overarching Kingdom of the Netherlands as established in the Charter for the Kingdom of the Netherlands. With this move, the United Nations deemed decolonization of the territory complete and removed it from the United Nations list of non-self-governing territories.
