= Transport in Aruba =

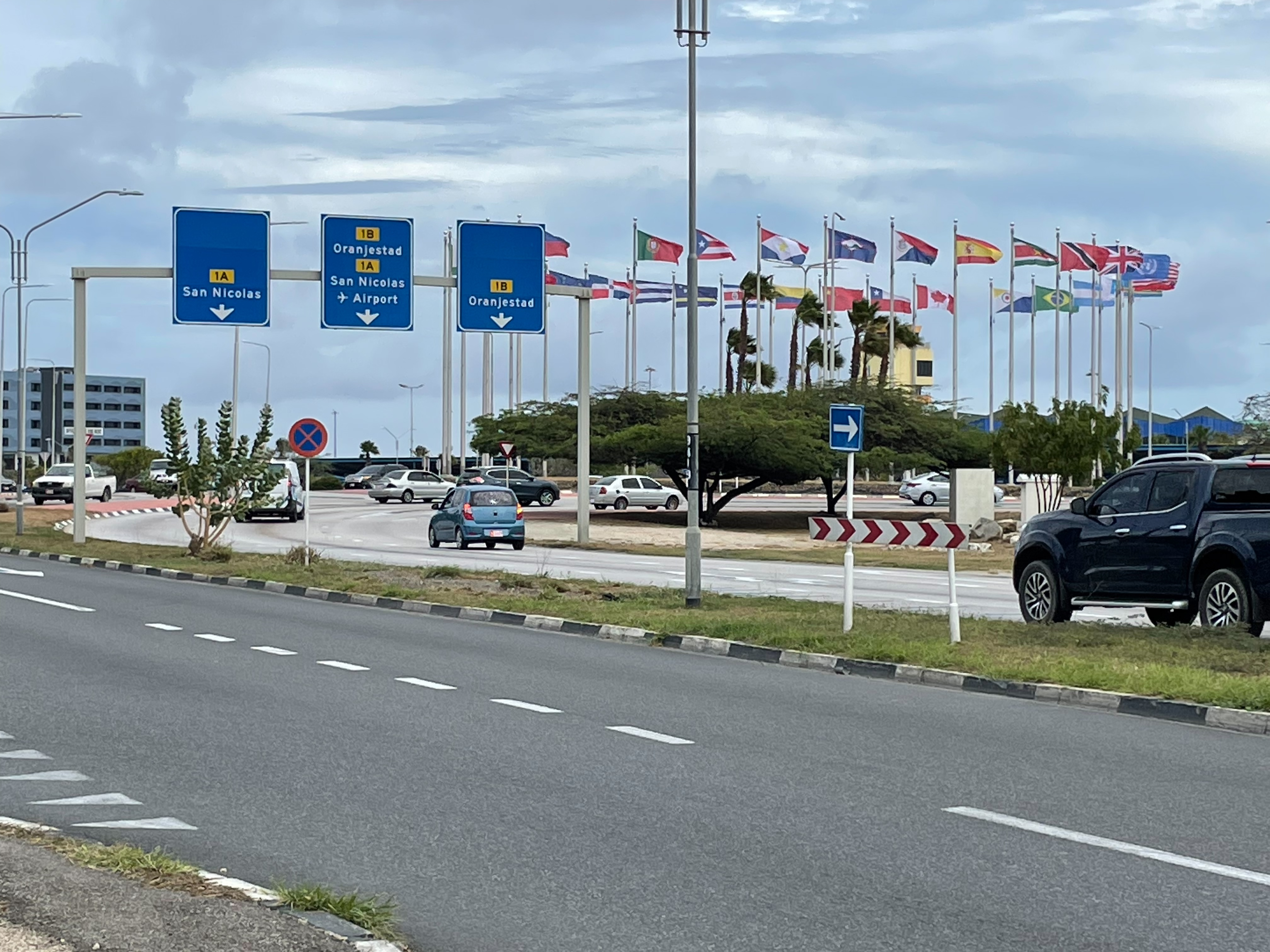
Road infrastructure with a turbo roundabout near Queen Beatrix International Airport (2021)

Transport in Aruba is facilitated by road, air, and rail. Aruba features a well-established road network, with the majority of the roads being paved. However, as one ventures towards the interior of the island, the prevalence of paved roads decreases, giving way to more rugged terrain. Conversely, coastal areas typically offer-well maintained paved roads. Aruba's road network covers a total distance of about 998 kilometres (620 mi), with 361 kilometres (220 mi) remaining unpaved.

== Public transport ==
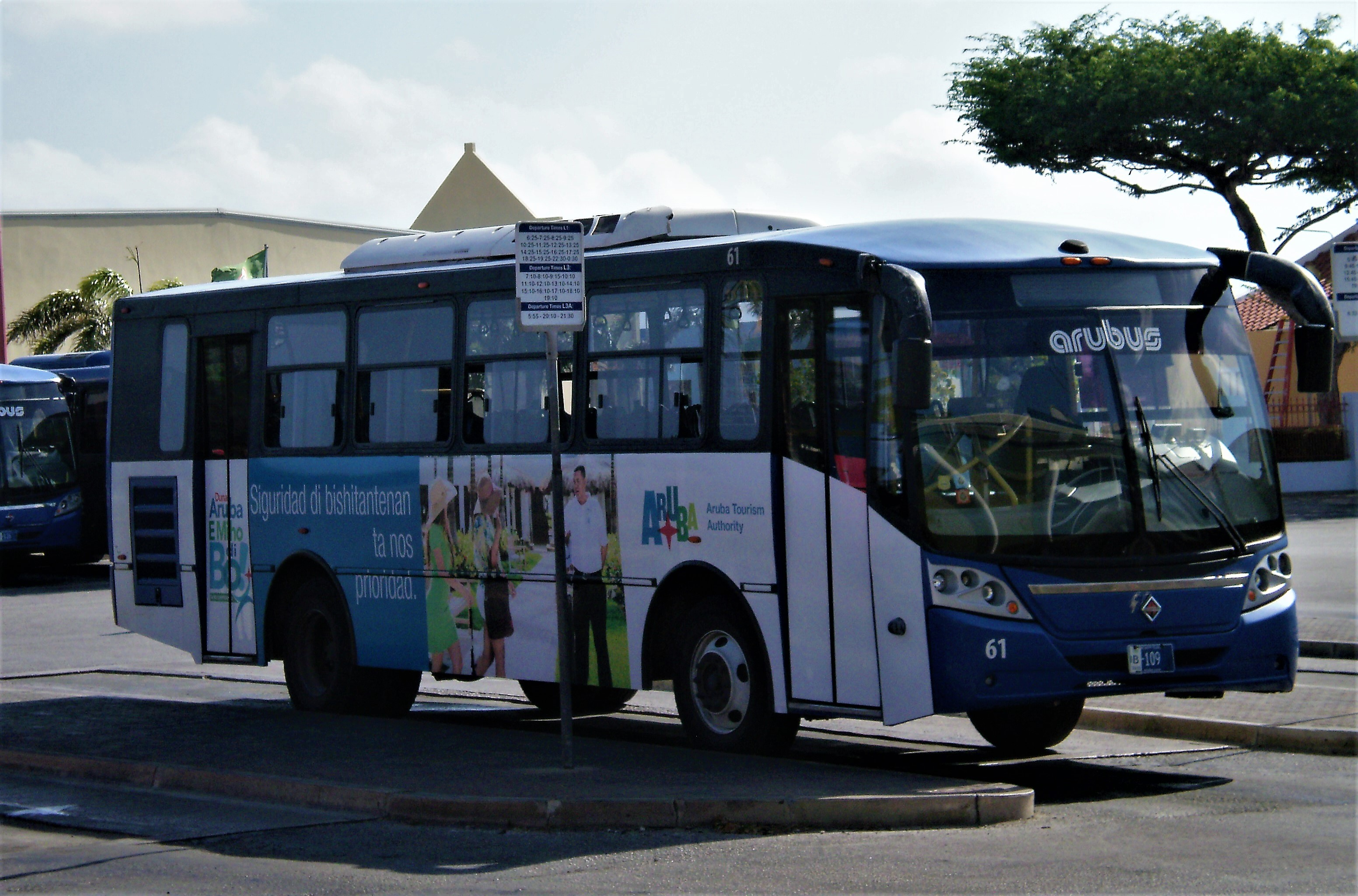
Bus at the bus station in Oranjestad (2017)

The department of public transport, also known in as Departamento di Transporte Publico (DTP) in Papiamento or Dienst Openbaar Personen Vervoer (DOPV) in Dutch, is the government agency overseeing various modes of public transportations, including taxis, buses, tour buses, and rental vehicle, such as cars, scooters, quads, races, and motorcycles). All public transportation services are required to obtain a transportation permit through DOPV.

=== Buses ===
Arubus N.V. is the major public transportation company and is owned by the Government of Aruba. It offers transportation services across large parts of the island, operating a fleet of approximately 29 buses. Mini-buses are also a common sight. There are two primary Arubus station located in Oranjestad and San Nicolas.

As per the Central Bureau of Statistics (CBS), the number of registered buses has remained relatively stable from 2015 to 2021. In 2015, there were 129 registered buses, and this number increased to 140 by 2021. In contrast to buses, the count of registered tour buses, has experienced a rapid increase, growing from 94 to 312.

Data from the CBS indicates a decline in the total number of bus passengers (excluding school children) from 2010 to 2021. In 2010, a total of 2,719,083 passengers were transported, whereas in 2021, the number decreased to 1,129,944.

== Air transport ==
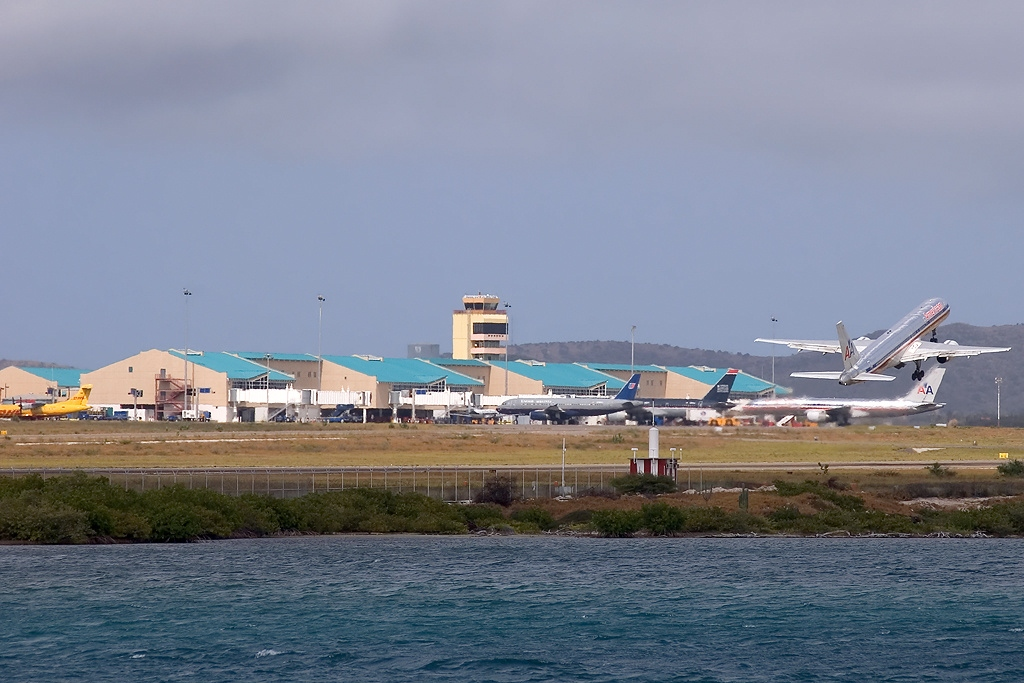
Queen Beatrix International Airport with planes at the terminals, American Airlines taking off (2006)

Travelers have the option to take short plane flights from Queen Beatrix International Airport. The major local airlines, Divi Divi Air and EZ Air, operate multiple daily flights between Aruba, Curaçao, and Bonaire. However, flying between the islands can be costly, and there have been persistent challenges. Since the 1970s, at least fifteen airlines, both local and from Europe, have made attempts in this regard. Local airlines, such as Air Aruba, have faced financial issues, leading to bankruptcies over the years.

The Antilliaanse Luchtvaartmaatschappij (ALM), or Antillean Airline, held the skies for 37 years, marking its status as the longest-running airline in the region. As a government-owned entity, it enjoyed a monopoly over the islands. ALM's reach extended to 26 flight destinations, with the largest portion (five) in Venezuela. In 2001, circumstances compelled it to halt its operations.

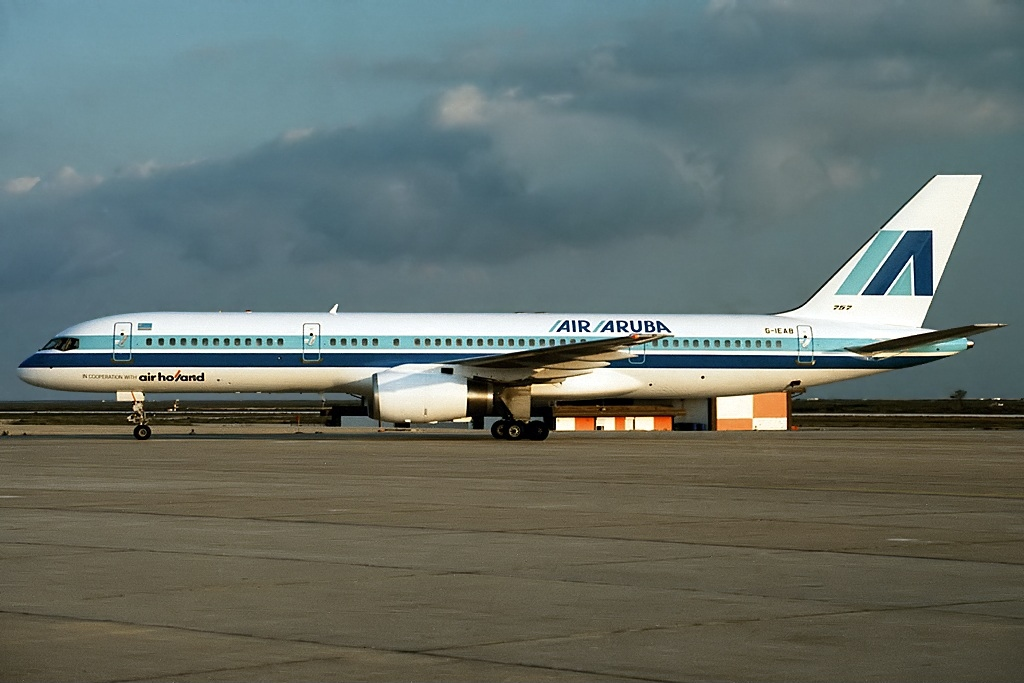
Air Aruba, former airline of Aruba (1989)

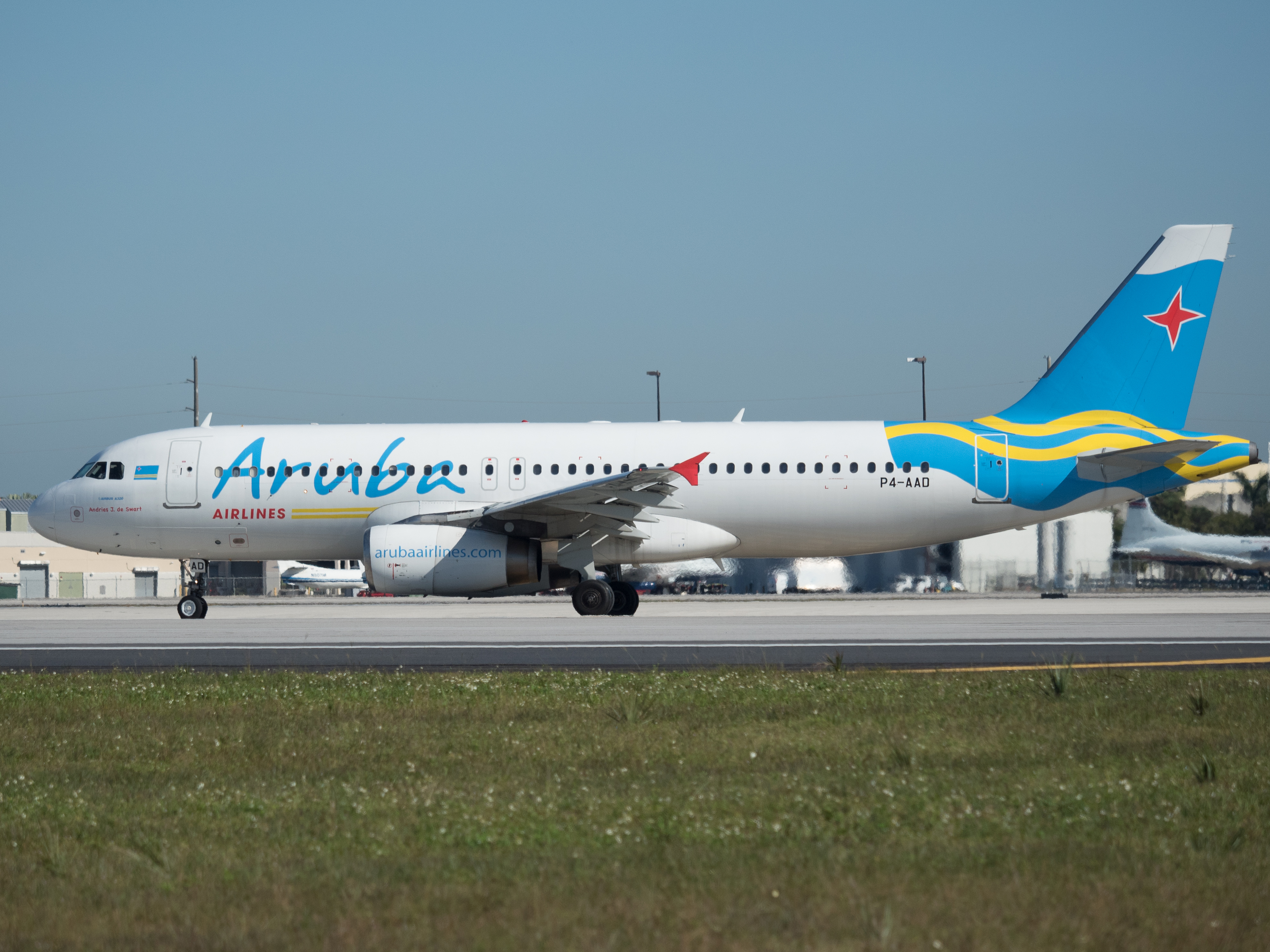
Aruba Airlines, flag carrier of Aruba (2016)

Director Edwin Kelly of the Directie Luchtvaart Aruba, or Aruba Aviation Directorate, highlights significant challenges: insufficient considerations of market changes. Kelly point out that the Venezuelan market was robust, as was the Cuban market, but liberalization has halted the latter. These markets are temporary and subject to fluctuations. Hence, Kelly emphasizes the need for a long-term strategy, not only for airline establishment but also for long-term viability and sustainability. However, it is crucial for the government to protect the route and maintain the connection between the islands.

Commercial and non-commercial total landings have seen a decline, dropping from 23,765 in 2015 to 11,294 in 2021. Notably, non-commercial landings have experienced the most significant decrease, falling from 6,219 to 986, in contrast to commercial landings, which decreased from 17,546 to 10,308.

== Water transport ==
=== Ports and harbours ===
Aruba has three ports or harbors: Barcadera, Oranjestad, and San Nicolas. The Aruba Ports Authority manages the operations of the ports in Barcadera and Oranjestad. The government has regained control of the former Valero Aruba Refining Company port. Ports in Barcadera and San Nicolas primarily serve industrial and oil-related purposes.

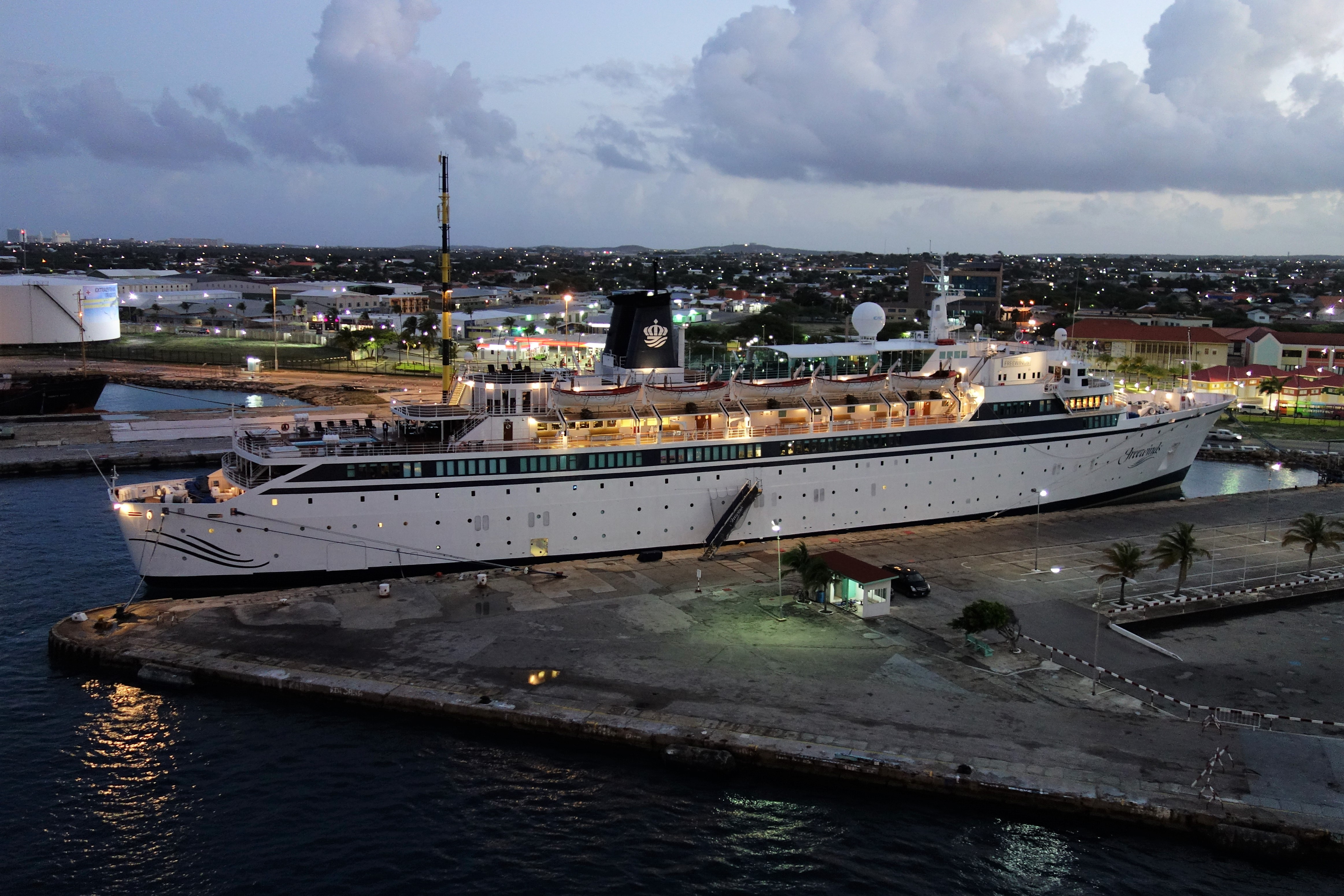
Small cruiship, Freewinds, docked at Oranjestad harbor (2017)

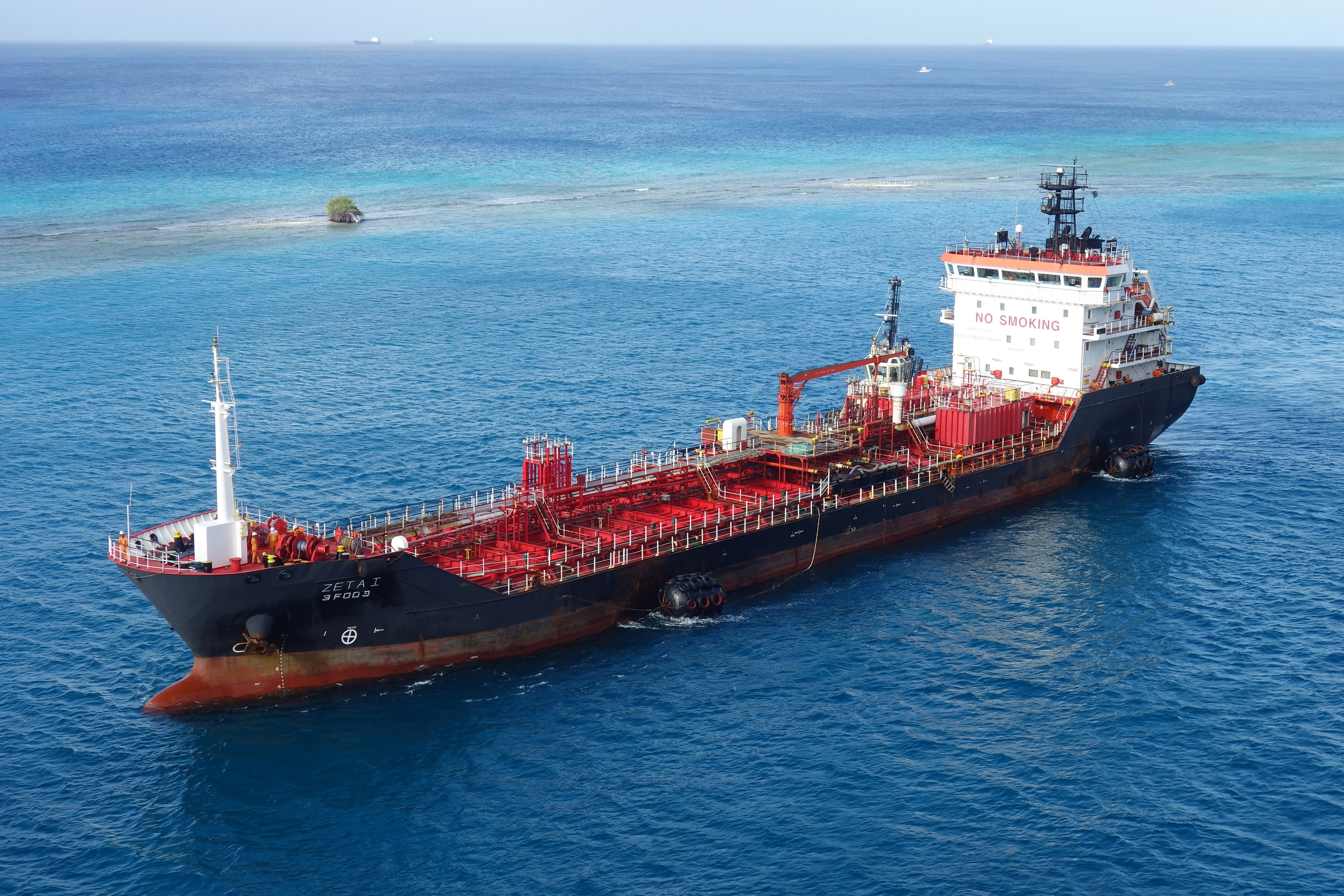
Oil Tanker ZETA I at Oranjestad harbor (2017)

=== Ferries ===
On 15 August 1973, a Venezuelan ferry from La Vela port in Coro made its inaugural journey to Aruba. By April 1975, the ferry has faced challenges in Aruba related to freight transportation and labor union issues. These difficulties have escalated to the extent that the ferry's management was contemplating the possibility of excluding Aruba from its sailing schedule.

In 2017, based on research of ICASUS Caribbean, the possibility of a fast ferry between the ABC-islands would be economically viable. However, challenges related to crime and illegal immigration are also recognized. Additionally, finding a suitable ferry represents another obstacle. Notably, there are few fast ferries capable of operating in this region due to the strong ocean currents.

Currently, there are no ferry services between Aruba, Curaçao, Bonaire and Venezuela. The only way to travels between these destinations is by air.

== Rail transport ==
=== Industrial railways ===
Historically, Aruba had three industrial narrow-gauge railways, although they are no longer in operation. These railways served various industrial purposes. The first railway used for the guano mines of the Aruba Phosphate Company in Seroe Colorado. The other two were primarily associated with for the oil industry. One belonged to the Lago Oil and Transport Company, a subsidiary of ExxonMobil, and the other was owned by the Arend Petroleum Company, a subsidiary of Royal Dutch Shell.

=== Trams ===
In 2012, a significant development in Aruba's transportation infrastructure occurred with the inauguration of a tramway line in Downtown Oranjestad. This addition marked notable expansion of public transportation options in the area and aimed to enhance mobility within the city.

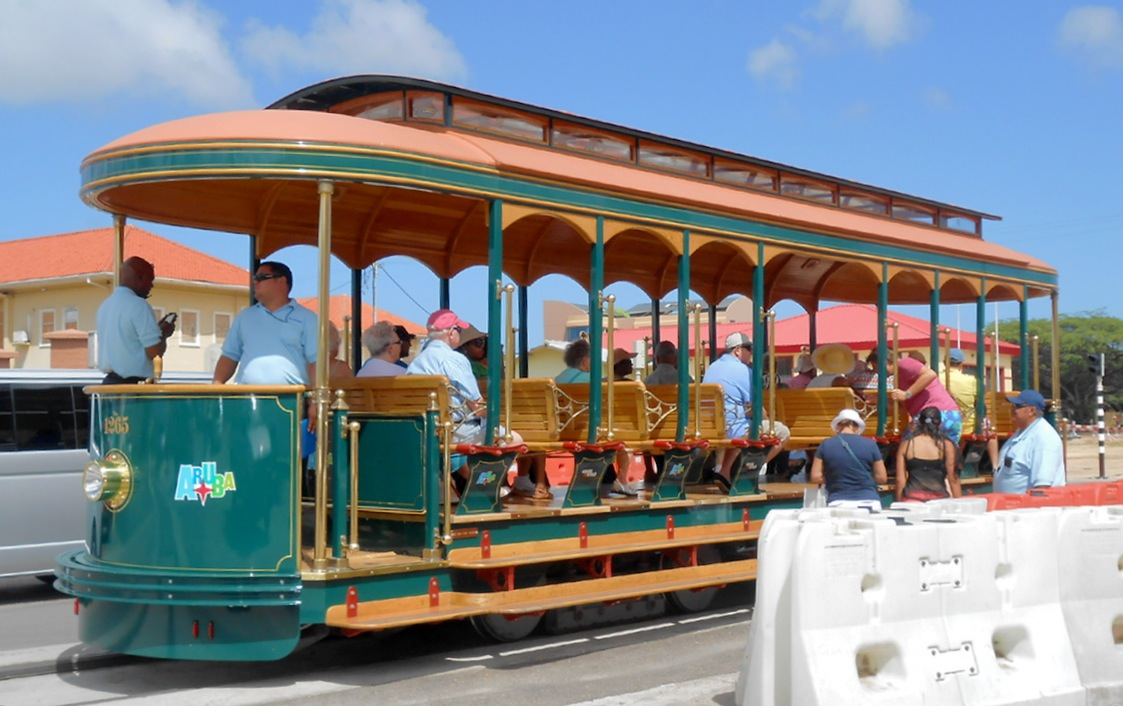
Streetcar in Oranjestad (2014)

== See also ==
- Vehicle registration plates of Aruba
- Economy of Aruba
- List of airlines of the Netherlands Antilles

== Sources ==
- Dew, L.A. (1977). "The Railroad at Lago" (PDF). The railroads of Aruba and Curacao. Wyt. pp. 27–46. ISBN 9060075781.
