= Vader Piet Wind Farm =

Wind farm in Aruba

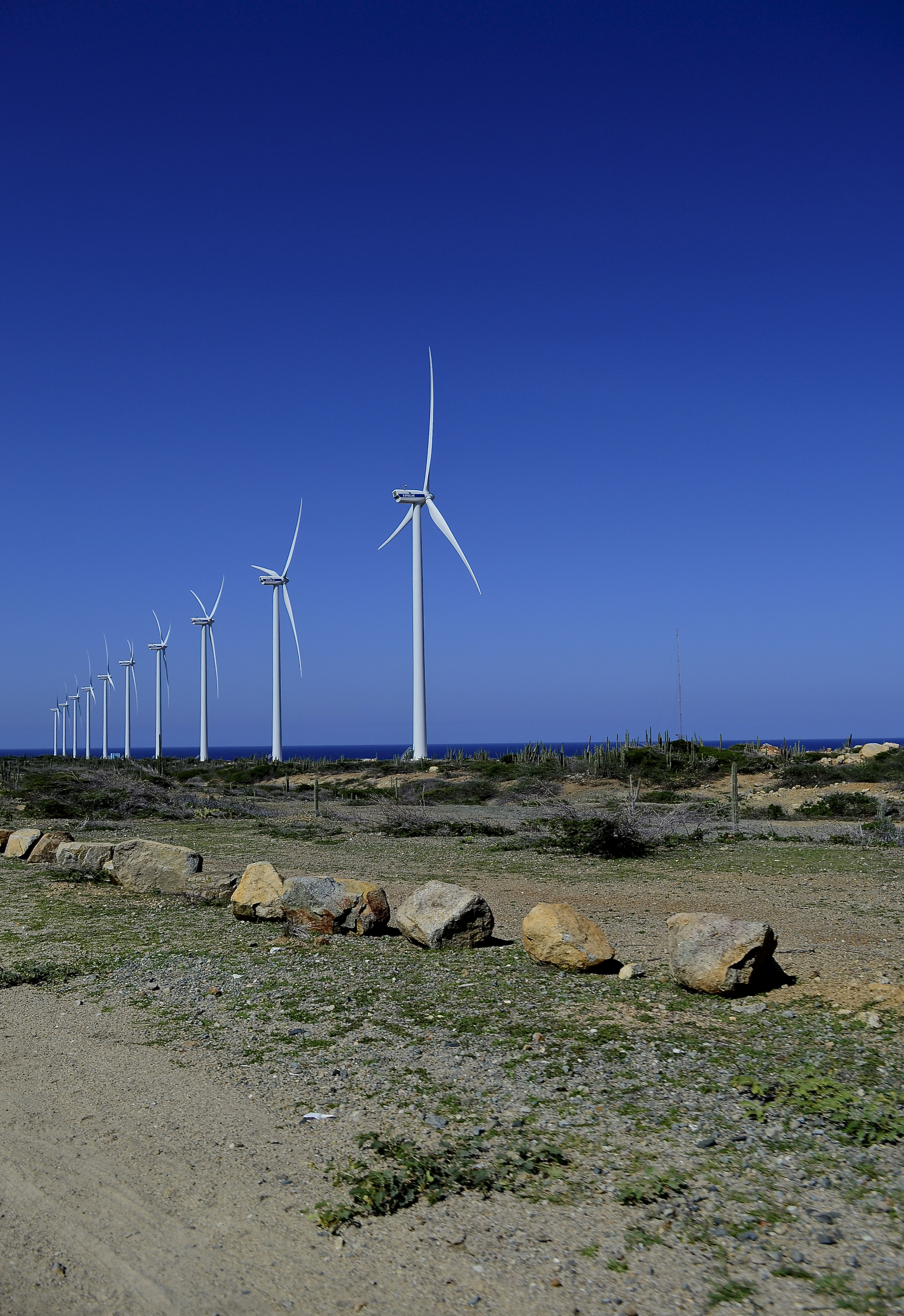
- Country: Netherlands
- Location: Aruba
- Coordinates: 12°28′27″N 69°53′28″W
- Status: Operational
- Commission date: December 2009
- Construction cost: US$75 million

Wind farm
- Hub height: 80 m
- Rotor diameter: 90 m (300 ft)
- Rated wind speed: 15 m/s (49 ft/s)

Power generation
- Units operational: 10 × 3 MW
- Make and model: Vestas V90/3000 (10)
- Nameplate capacity: 30 MW

External links
- Website: www.windparkvaderpiet.com
- Commons: Related media on Commons

The Vader Piet Wind Farm is a wind farm in Aruba. It is the first wind farm in the territory.

== History ==
The establishment of the wind farm was proposed in February 2008. The wind farm was then commissioned in December 2009, making it the first wind farm in Aruba.

== Technical specifications ==
Wind turbine locations

The wind farm has an installed capacity of 30 MW, which consists of ten units of 3.0 MW turbines. Each wind turbine tower stands at a height of 80 m.

== Finance ==
The wind farm was constructed at a cost of US$75 million.

== See also ==
- Economy of Aruba
