= RECIP IV Power Station =

Photovoltaic power plant in Oranjestad, Aruba

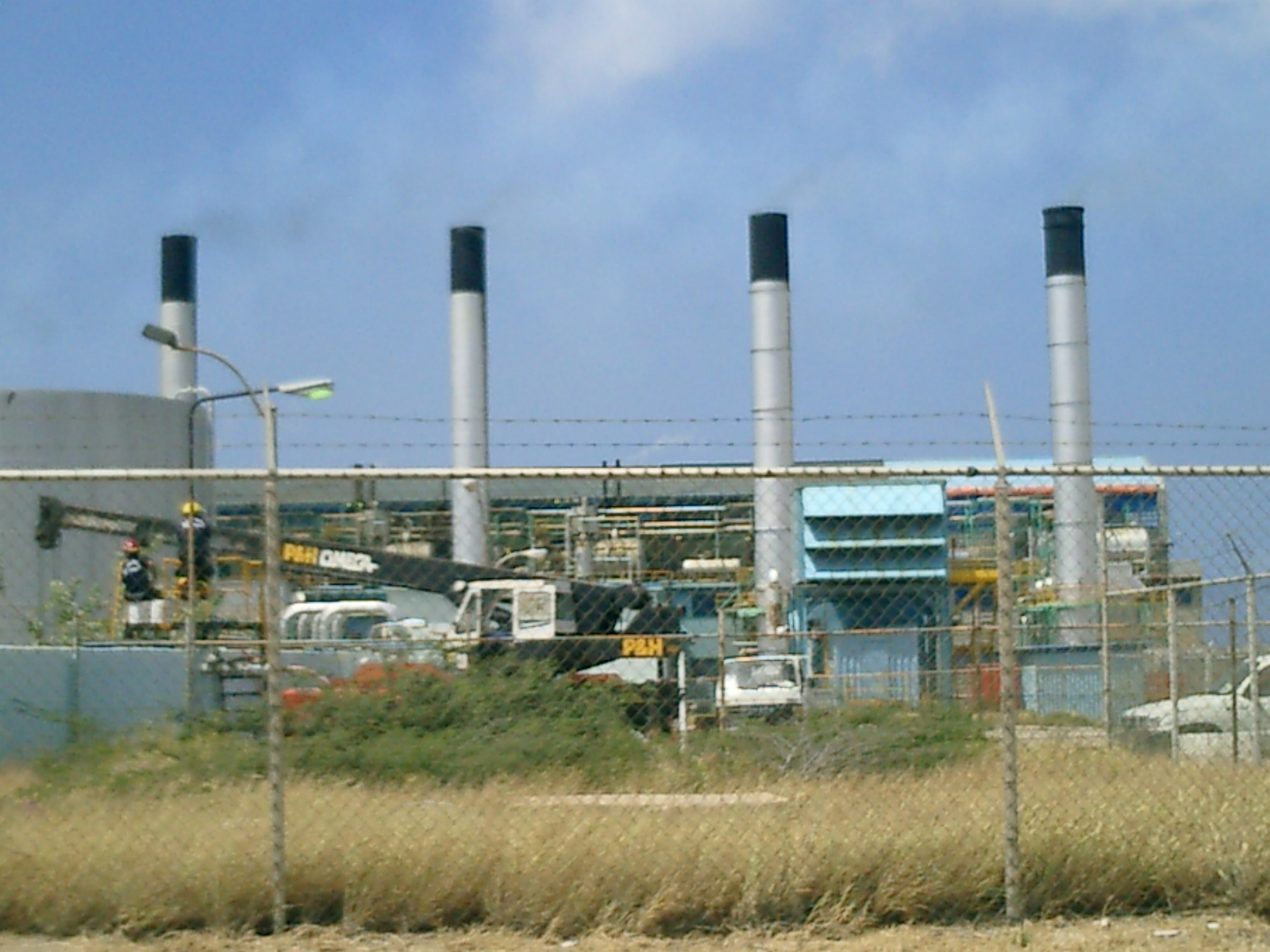
- Country: Netherlands
- Location: Oranjestad, Aruba
- Coordinates: 12°28′33.4″N 69°58′56.1″W
- Status: Operational
- Construction began: 2020
- Commission date: June 2022
- Owner: Water – En Energiebedrijf Aruba N.V.

Thermal power station
- Primary fuel: Diesel fuel

Power generation
- Units operational: 6
- Nameplate capacity: 102 MW

External links
- Commons: Related media on Commons

The RECIP IV Power Station is a diesel fuel power station in Oranjestad, Aruba.

== History ==
In December 2018, the contract to construct the power station was awarded to Wärtsilä. The construction of the power station started in 2020. The power station was then commissioned in June 2022.

== Technical specifications ==
The power station has six generating units with a total installed generation capacity of 102 MW.

== See also ==
- Economy of Aruba
