= Semeleer =

Semeleer is a surname. Notable people with the surname include:

- Endy Semeleer (born 1995), Curaçaoan-Dutch kickboxer
- Jane Semeleer, Aruban economist
