= Mohammad Yeganeh =

Iranian politician

Mohammed Yeganeh
- محمد یگانه
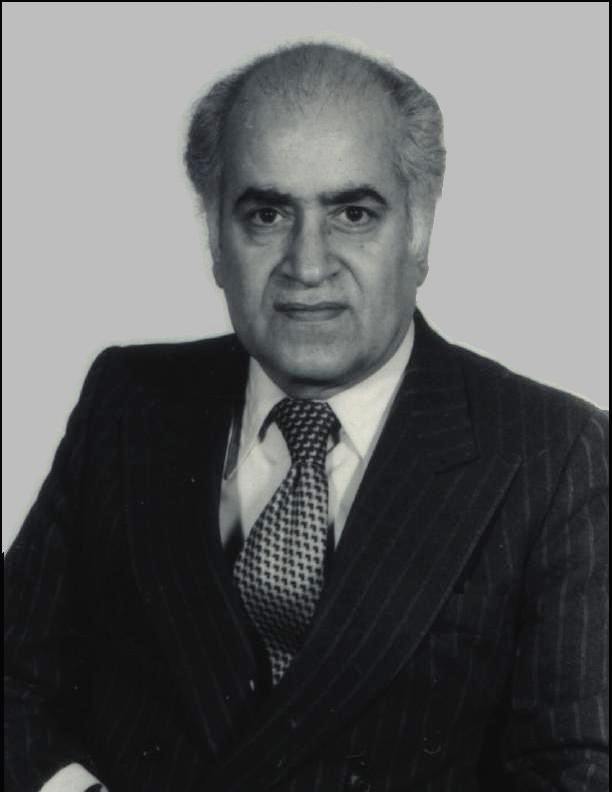

Minister of Finance
- In office December 1977 – 6 November 1978
- Monarch: Mohammad Reza Shah
- Prime Minister: Jamshid Amouzegar; Jafar Sharif-Emami
- Preceded by: Hushang Ansary
- Succeeded by: Hassanali Mehran

Minister of State in charge of Planning and Budget
- In office 7 August 1977 – December 1977
- Prime Minister: Jamshid Amouzegar

Personal details
- Born: 5 May 1923 Zanjan, Iran
- Died: 18 December 1995 (aged 72) Baltimore, Maryland, U.S.A.
- Spouse: Johanna Yeganeh (1936–1995, his death)
- Children: Jafar; Jamshid; Freidoon
- Education: Columbia University

Mohammed Yeganeh (5 May 1923 – 18 December 1995) was an Iranian economist who was the Governor of the Central Bank of Iran from 1973 to 1975.

Yeganeh attended Tehran University from 1942 to 1946 obtaining a BA in Law and BA in Economics and then attended Columbia University from 1947 to 1951 obtaining an MA in economics. He wrote his dissertation thesis on 'Commercial policies and foreign trade of Iran'. He later worked for the United Nations as an economic affairs officer. It was at the United Nations that Yeganeh worked under Charles Issawi, with whom he co-authored The Economics of Middle Eastern Oil in 1962.

He served in various positions including Deputy Minister of Economy of Iran for industrial and trade development (1964–69), Minister of Development & Housing of Iran (1969–70), chairman of the board of the Mortgage Bank of Iran (1969–70), senior economic advisor to the prime minister of Iran (1970–71), alternate executive director of the World Bank (1971-1972), executive director of IMF (1972–73), governor of the Central Bank of Iran (1973–75), minister of state of Iran dealing with international economic relations in regards to OPEC, Paris Conference on International Economic Cooperation, CIEC (1976–77), minister of state in charge of Planning & Budget Organization of Iran (1977), chairman of the board of directors of OPEC Fund for International Development and chairman of the working committee that established the OPEC Fund (1976-1979), Minister of Finance of Iran (1977–78), alternate executive director of IMF (1978-1980), adjunct professor of economics at Columbia University (1980–85).

During the Islamic Revolution in November 1978, he emigrated to the United States. From 1980 to 1985 he worked as a professor of economics at the Columbia University.

Yeganeh died on 18 December 1995 in Baltimore.

== Books ==
- The Economics of Middle Eastern Oil (1962)

Government offices
Preceded by Abdolali Jahanshahi	Governor of the Central Bank of Iran; 1973–1975	Succeeded by Hassan-Ali Mehran
