= Central Bank of Aruba =

Central Bank of Aruba Centrale Bank van Aruba

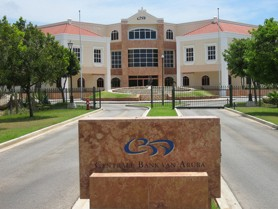
- Office of the Centrale Bank van Aruba
- Central bank of: Aruba
- Headquarters: J.E. Irausquin Boulevard, 8 Oranjestad, Aruba
- Established: 1 January 1986
- Ownership: 100% state ownership
- President: Thomas G.W.A. Domhoff
- Currency: Aruban florin
- Reserves: 710 million USD
- Website: www.cbaruba.org

The Central Bank of Aruba (Papiamento: Banco Central di Aruba, Dutch: Centrale Bank van Aruba) is the central bank in Aruba responsible for implementation of monetary policy of the Aruban florin.

== History ==
The Centrale Bank van Aruba (the Bank) started its operations on January 1, 1986, when Aruba obtained its status as an autonomous country within the Kingdom of the Netherlands. Prior to this period, Aruba formed part of the Netherlands Antilles under jurisdiction of the Bank of the Netherlands Antilles.

The bank is a legal entity in itself (sui generis) with an autonomous position within Aruba's public sector. With the inception of the bank, the Aruban florin was brought into circulation at the same rate as the Netherlands Antillean guilder, pegged to the U.S. dollar at a rate of Afl. 1.79 (= 1 NAf.) = US$1.00. This exchange rate has remained unchanged since then.

The principle tasks of the bank are to maintain the internal and external value of the florin and to promote the soundness and integrity of the financial system.

== Presidents ==
The Central Bank of Aruba is currently led by its president Mrs. Jeanette R Semeleer.

- Elias F. Mansur, January 1986
- Hassan Ali Mehran, Iranian, January 1986 - March 1986
- A. J. T. Williams, 1986-1988
- Emile den Dunnen, 1988-1991
- Arthur Irausquin, 1991-1995
- Hans du Marchie Sarvaas, 1995-2000
- Anthony Caram, 2000-2004
- Robert Henriquez, 2004-2007
- Hassan Ali Mehran, Iranian, 2007-2008
- Jeanette R Semeleer, 2008-2025
- Thomas G.W.A. Domhoff, 2026-present

== Main functions and activities ==
=== The principal tasks of the bank ===
The principal tasks of the bank, as stipulated in the Central Bank Ordinance (A.B. 1991 No. GT 32), are to:

Conduct monetary policy; Supervise the financial system; Issue bank notes; Issue coins on behalf of the government; Act as the banker for the government; Be the central foreign exchange bank and, as such, to regulate the flow of payments to and from other countries; and to advise the Minister of Finance on financial matters.

=== Activities ===
The bank performs these tasks through a variety of activities, which include:

Formulating and implementing monetary policy and related measures through, among other things, regulating bank credit and liquidity;

- Supervising the activities of the commercial banks and other financial institutions by, inter alia, monitoring their liquidity and solvency to protect the interests of depositors and policyholders, and to maintain monetary and financial stability and integrity in Aruba;
- Managing Aruba's official gold and foreign exchange reserves;
- Regulating international payments according to the State Ordinance on foreign exchange transactions (A.B. 1990 No. GT 6);
- Bringing bank notes into circulation to meet the needs of businesses and the general public;
- Issuing treasury bills and government bonds as an agent for the government; and

Monitoring economic and financial developments.

== See also ==
- Economy of Aruba
- Aruban florin
- Bank of the Netherlands Antilles
- Central Bank of Curaçao and Sint Maarten
- De Nederlandsche Bank
- List of central banks
- List of financial supervisory authorities by country
