= Jane Semeleer =

President of the Central Bank of Aruba

Jeanette Semeleer

8th President of the Central Bank of Aruba
- Incumbent
- Assumed office 2008
- Monarchs: Beatrix (1980–2013); Willem-Alexander (2013–present)
- Premier: Nelson Oduber (2004–2009); Mike Eman (2009–2017, 2025–present); Evelyn Wever-Croes (2017–2025)
- Preceded by: Hassanali Mehran

Personal details
- Education: University of Toledo

Jeanette Semeleer is an Aruban economist who has been the president of the Central Bank of Aruba since 2008.

As president of the bank, Semeleer oversaw a seven-year enterprise to redesign the Aruban florin banknotes in partnership with Crane Currency. The new banknotes, first issued in 2019, are decorated with the indigenous plants and animals of Aruba. The International Bank Note Society designated the new 100 florin as the "Banknote of the Year for 2019".

Semeleer joined the CBA in 1990, eventually leading several of its departments and becoming a member of its board in 2000. Before the CBA, she served as an advisor for Aruba's Department of Economic Affairs as well as the Department of Foreign Relations. She is a 1984 graduate of the University of Toledo, where she studied economics.
