= Hassan Ali Mehran =

Iranian economist (born 1937)

Minister of Economy and Finance
- In office 1978–1979

Governor of the Central Bank of Iran
- In office 1975–1978
- Preceded by: Mohammad Yeganeh
- Succeeded by: Yousef Khoshkish

Governor of the Central Bank of Aruba
- In office January 1986 – March 1986
- Preceded by: Elias F. Mansur
- Succeeded by: A. J. T. Williams,
- In office 2007–2008
- Preceded by: Robert Henriquez
- Succeeded by: Jeanette R Semeleer

Personal details
- Born: 1937 (age 88–89)
- Education: University of Nottingham

Hassan Ali Mehran (Persian: حسنعلی مهران born 1937) is an Iranian bureaucrat who was the governor of Central Bank between 1975 and 1978 and minister of economy and finance between 1978 and 1979 during the reign of Shah Mohammad Reza Pahlavi. He left Iran and settled in the USA.

== Early life and education ==
Mehran was born in Tehran in 1937. He completed his secondary education at Alborz High School. He obtained a degree in political science and economics from the University of Nottingham.

== Career ==
Following his graduation Mehran taught at the University of Bristol for a short period. Then he worked at the International Monetary Fund and then returned to Iran. He was the deputy minister of economy between 1967 and 1975. He also served as the deputy head of the National Iranian Oil Company. In 1975 he was named as the governor of Central Bank, replacing Mohammad Yeganeh in the post. He remained in office until 1978 when he was succeeded by Yousef Khoshkish in the post. Mehran was appointed minister of economy and finance in 1978 which he held until 1979.

Mehran was the governor of the Central Bank of Aruba for two terms, in 1986 and between 2007 and 2008.

== Personal life and work ==
Mehran and his wife left Iran following the regime change in 1979 and settled in the USA. In 2013 he published a book entitled The Goals and Policies of the Central Bank of Iran: 1960-1978.
