= Aruban florin =

Currency of Aruba

Arubaanse florin (Dutch); florin Arubiano (Papiamento); Afl.

ISO 4217
- Code: AWG (numeric: 533)
- Subunit: 0.01

Units of account
- Plural: florin
- Symbol: Aƒ, ƒ
- Subunit
- 1/100: cent
- Plural
- cent: cent

Denominations
- Banknotes: Afl. 10, Afl. 25, Afl. 50, Afl. 100, Afl. 200
- Coins: 5¢, 10¢, 25¢, 50¢, Afl. 1, Afl. 2½, Afl. 5

Demographics
- Date of introduction: 1986
- Replaced: Netherlands Antillean guilder
- User(s): Aruba

Issuance
- Central bank: Central Bank of Aruba
- Website: cbaruba.org
- Printer: Crane Currency
- Website: cranecurrency.com
- Mint: Royal Dutch Mint
- Website: royaldutchmint.com

Valuation
- Inflation: 4.4% (2011)
- Method: CPI
- Pegged with: 1 U.S. dollar = Afl. 1.79

The Aruban florin (Dutch: [floːˈrɪn]; abbreviation: Afl.; code: AWG), also called the Aruban guilder, is the currency of Aruba. It is subdivided into 100 cents. The florin was introduced in 1986, replacing the Netherlands Antillean guilder at par. The currency is pegged to the US dollar at (or very near) AWG1.79 per USD1.00.

== Coins ==
In 1986, coins were introduced in denominations of 5, 10, 25 and 50 cents and 1 and 2 1/2 florin. Later, the 5-florin banknote was replaced by a square coin and the 2 1/2-florin coin was removed from circulation. The 5-florin was replaced in 2005 with a round gold-coloured coin, because the old square 5-florin coin was too easy to counterfeit. All coins are struck in nickel-bonded steel with exception of the 5-florin, which is an alloy of copper and other metals. The 50 cent is the only square-shaped coin remaining, also commonly referred to as a "yotin" by the locals.

On the back of each 1-, 2 1/2- and 5-florin coin is a profile view of the current head of state of the Kingdom of the Netherlands. From 1986 to 2013, this was Queen Beatrix and since 2014 it has been King Willem-Alexander. Moreover, only these three denominations have writing on their edge, namely God zij met ons, meaning 'God be with us'.

The Aruban florin coins, from left to right: 5, 10, 25, 50 cents and 1, 2 1/2 and 5 florin, before 2005.	2004 5-florin coin, slightly smaller than the 1-florin coin.	2012 (obverse)/2014 (reverse) 1-florin coin with Willem-Alexander on the reverse, as issued since 2013

== Banknotes ==
The Central Bank of Aruba (Centrale Bank van Aruba) introduced banknotes in denominations of 5, 10, 25, 50 and 100 florin and dated 1 January 1986. In 1990, the bank issued the same denominations in a colourful new family of notes designed by Aruban artist Evelino Fingal. As director of the Archaeological Museum, Fingal found inspiration in old Indian paintings and pot shards. Fingal combined decorative motifs found on pre-Columbian pottery with pictures of animals unique to the island. The 500-florin notes were introduced in 1993, with the 5-florin note replaced by a square coin in 1995.

As of 2003, a new print was started of the then already existing banknotes of 10, 25, 50, 100 and 500 florin. These new banknotes were made with new safety features to counteract counterfeiting, but retained their look.

In 2019, the bank unveiled a new series of banknotes in denominations of 10, 25, 50, 100 and 200 florin, with the latter serving as a new denomination. The theme presented for this series is "Life in Aruba", as it contains elements of Aruban flora, fauna, cultural heritage, monuments and landmarks. They were issued on 4 June 2019, and is circulating alongside the 2003 series until 11 August, after which the 2003 series of banknotes were no longer legal tender. Commercial banks in Aruba accepted the 2003 series of banknotes until 4 December, afterward the notes will be redeemed at the Central Bank of Aruba for up to 30 years, until 11 August 2049. The 100 Florin note was awarded "2019 Banknote of the Year" by The International Banknote Society for its content, art, and security features.

1990–1993 series Aruban florin banknotes
Image		Value	Main colour	Depicted animal
Obverse	Reverse	Value	Main colour	Depicted animal
		Afl. 5	Purple	Turtle
		Afl. 10	Blue	Conch
		Afl. 25	Orange	Rattlesnake
		Afl. 50	Red	Burrowing owl
		Afl. 100	Green	Frog
		Afl. 500	Brown	Red grouper

2003 series Aruban florin banknotes
Image		Value	Main colour	Depicted animal
Obverse	Reverse	Value	Main colour	Depicted animal
		Afl. 10	Blue	Conch
		Afl. 25	Orange	Rattlesnake
		Afl. 50	Red	Burrowing owl
		Afl. 100	Green	Frog
		Afl. 500	Brown	Red grouper

Banknotes of the Aruban florin (2019 issue) Date of issue 1 January 2019
Image		Value	Main colour	Description	
Obverse	Reverse	Value	Main colour	Obverse	Reverse
		Afl. 10	Blue	Green sea turtle	Bushiribana gold mill ruins
		Afl. 25	Orange	Venezuelan troupial	Arawak pottery and cave paintings
		Afl. 50	Red/purple	Red land crab	Willem III Tower, Fort Zoutman (Oranjestad)
		Afl. 100	Green	Green iguana	Baile di Cinta dancers
		Afl. 200	Brown	Crested caracara	Caha di orgel, drum

== Current exchange rates ==
Current AWG exchange rates
From Google Finance:	AUD CAD CHF CNY EUR GBP HKD JPY USD JPY USD
From Yahoo! Finance:	AUD CAD CHF CNY EUR GBP HKD JPY USD JPY USD
From XE.com:	AUD CAD CHF CNY EUR GBP HKD JPY USD JPY USD
From OANDA:	AUD CAD CHF CNY EUR GBP HKD JPY USD JPY USD

== See also ==
- Economy of Aruba
- Central banks and currencies of the Caribbean
- Caribbean Guilder
