= Trams in Oranjestad =

Tramway line in Oranjestad, Aruba

Coordinates: 12°31′12.3″N 70°02′13.2″W

Oranjestad streetcar
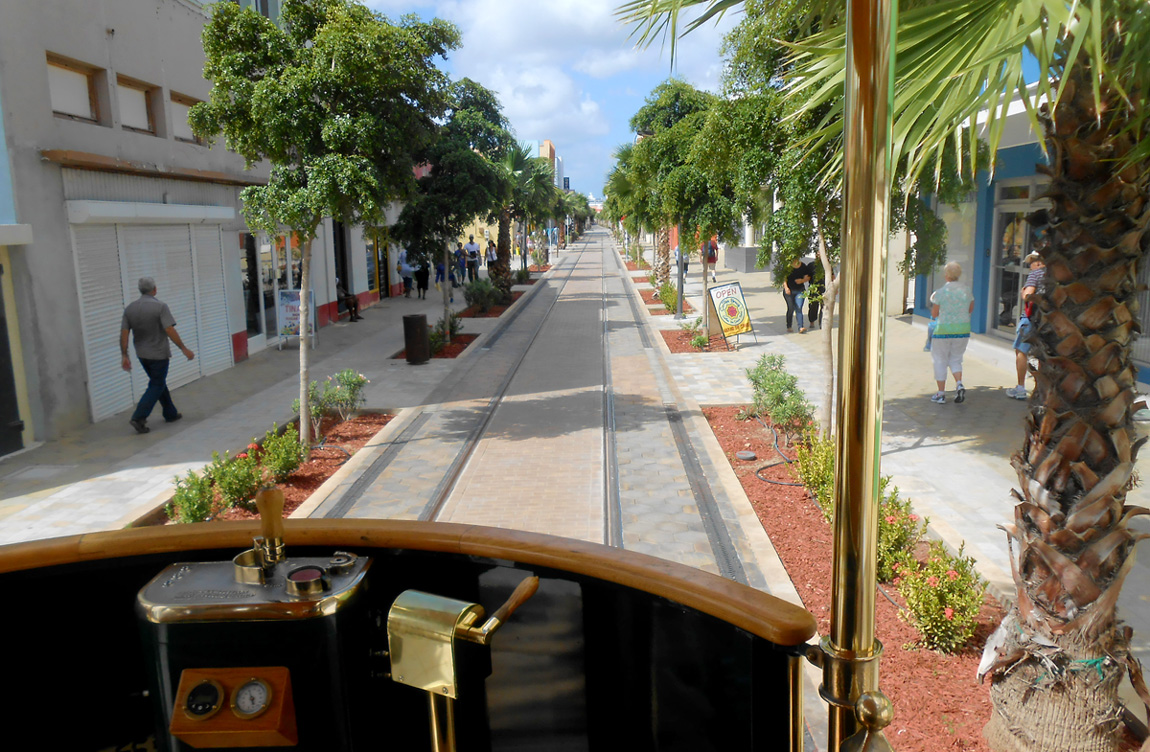
- View of the track on Caya B. Croes, near Plaza Chipi Chipi

Overview
- Owner: Arubus N.V.
- Locale: Oranjestad, Aruba
- Termini: Welcome Plaza (Oranjestad); Plaza Nicky (Oranjestad)
- Stations: 8 (regular service) 10 (total)

Service
- Type: Tram
- Operator: Arubus N.V.
- Rolling stock: 4 trams

History
- Opened: 22 December 2012

Technical
- Line length: 1.9 km (1.2 mi)
- Num of tracks: Single track
- Track gauge: 1,435 mm (4 ft 8 1/2 in) standard gauge
Route map
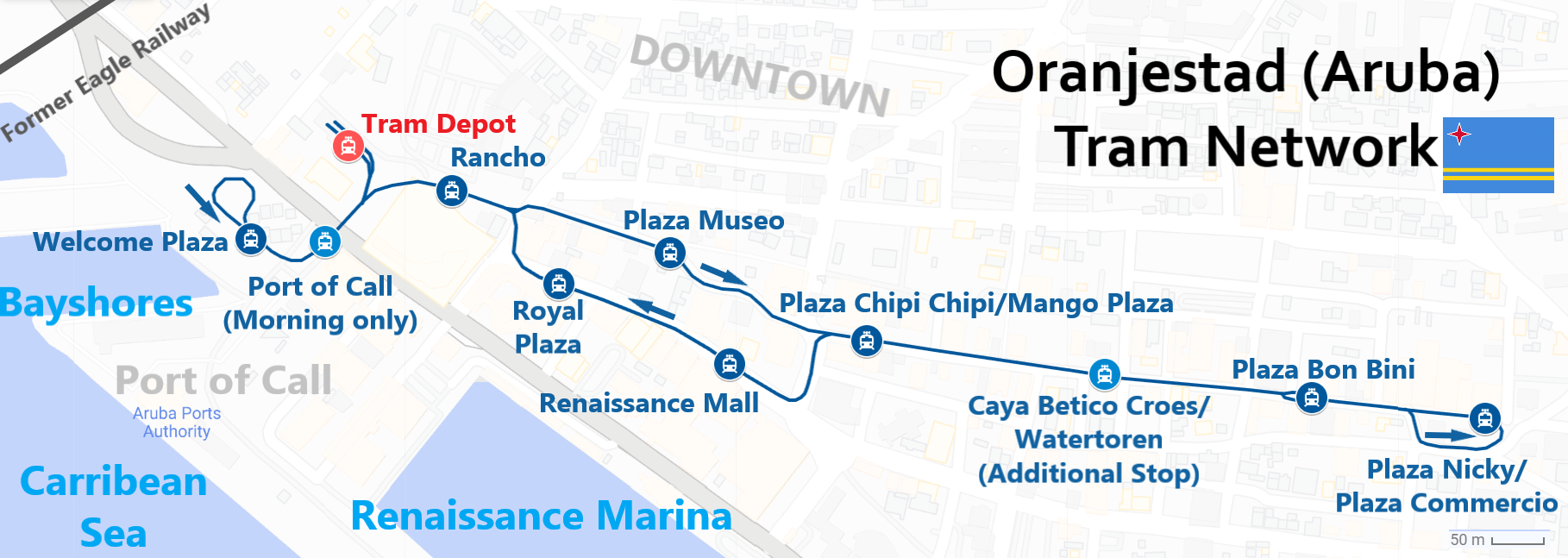
- Sources: Tramz.COM; OpenStreetMap.ORG; File:Map of Oranjestad Streetcar.png

The Oranjestad Streetcar (Dutch: Tram van Oranjestad; Papiamento: Tranvia Oranjestad) is a single-track tram line in Oranjestad, the capital city of Aruba. It is owned and operated by Arubus, the national public transportation company. It was built as a key component of a larger project to upgrade the main retail areas of the town, other aspects of which included pedestrianization of streets, planting of trees, installation of ornamental street lighting and resurfacing of streets and sidewalks.

== History ==
The line is the first and so far the only passenger rail service on the island and the rest of the Dutch Caribbean. Three industrial railways had been constructed on the island, but have all closed. It was inaugurated on 22 December 2012, seven days after the arrival of the first single-deck car. Regular service started on 19 February 2013. The second car, an open-top double-decker, was delivered in June 2013. The heritage style streetcars were designed and manufactured by TIG/m Modern Street Railways in California, USA.

The line operates daily. As of early 2016, service was operating from 9:00 to 17:00, with two cars in service after 11:00.

== Route ==
The line starts from a balloon loop near the Port of Call Marketplace and serves the downtown area with a route along Schelpstraat, Havenstraat and Caya Betico Croes, the main road, which is open to pedestrians only. Between Rancho and Plaza Chipi Chipi, eastbound trams (towards Plaza Nicky) run via Schelpstraat, and westbound ones (towards Welcome Plaza), run via Havenstraat. It ends at Plaza Nicky, with a stop also located on a loop.

There are a total of 9 stops situated approximately 200 metres (660 ft) apart from each other. The depot is located between the stops at Port of Call and Rancho.

| Station | Notes |
|---|---|
| Welcome Plaza | Port |
| Port of Call | Morning service stop, touring bus station |
| Rancho | Oranjestad Bus Terminal, tram depot |
| Plaza Museo | Eastbound service, Archaeological Museum |
| Royal Plaza | Westbound service |
| Renaissance Mall | Westbound service, Renaissance Mall |
| Plaza Chipi Chipi/Mango Plaza | Also named "Mango Plaza" |
| Caya Betico Croes/Watertoren | Near Aruba Bank, additional stop, name not yet defined, sometimes called Watertoren |
| Plaza Bon Bini | 2 rail tracks before the station |
| Plaza Nicky/Plaza Comercio | Also named "Plaza Comercio", loop |

== Rolling stock ==
The fleet comprises four streetcars (AE) or trams (CE), of which two are single-deck (green and orange) and two are open-top double-deck (blue and red). They were designed and built by TIG/m Modern Street Railways in Chatsworth, USA, to use hybrid/electric technology: they do not take their power from external sources such as overhead wires when running but are self-powered by lithium batteries augmented by hydrogen fuel cells. Power consumption is reduced by regenerative braking.

== Gallery ==
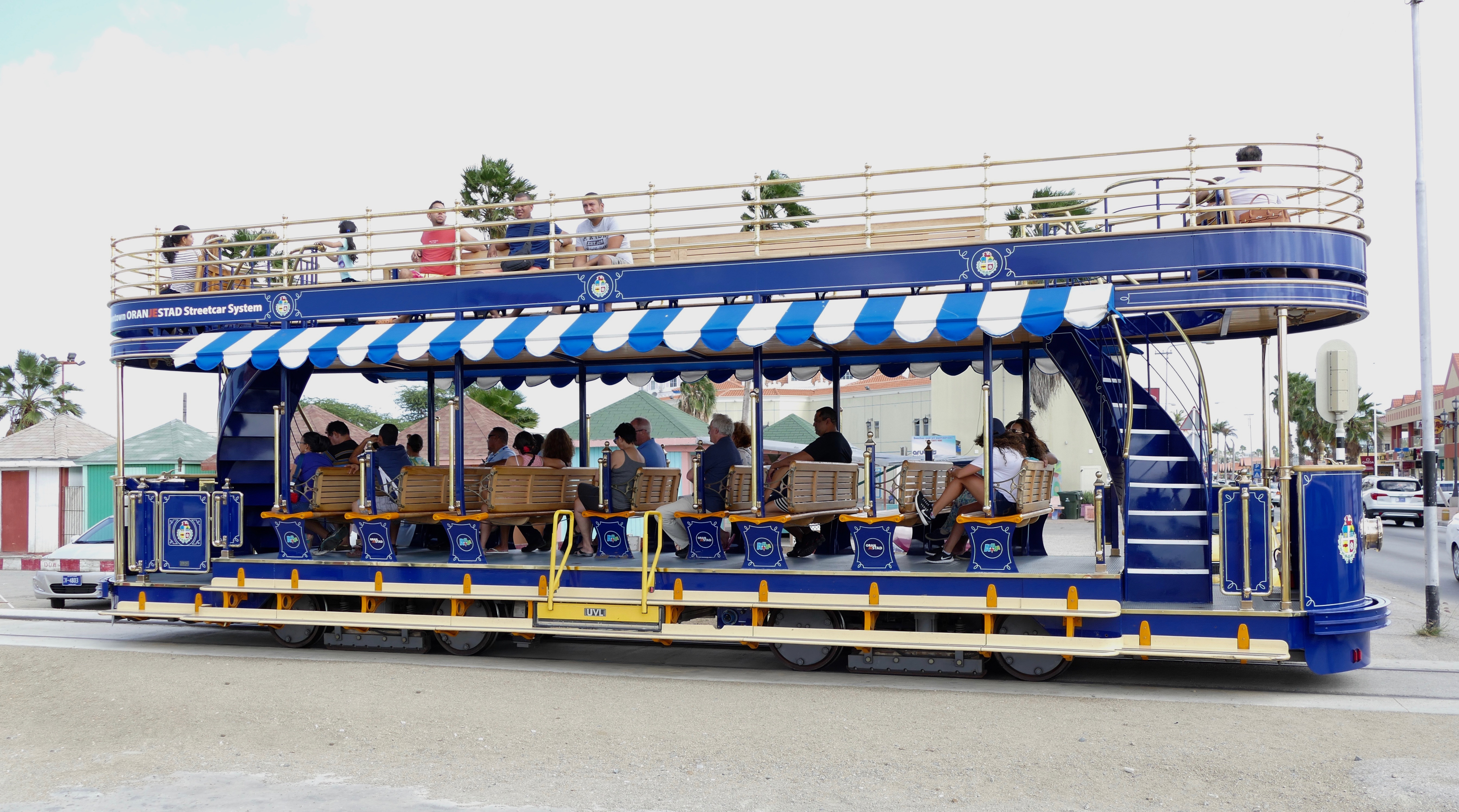
Double-deck tram in 2016

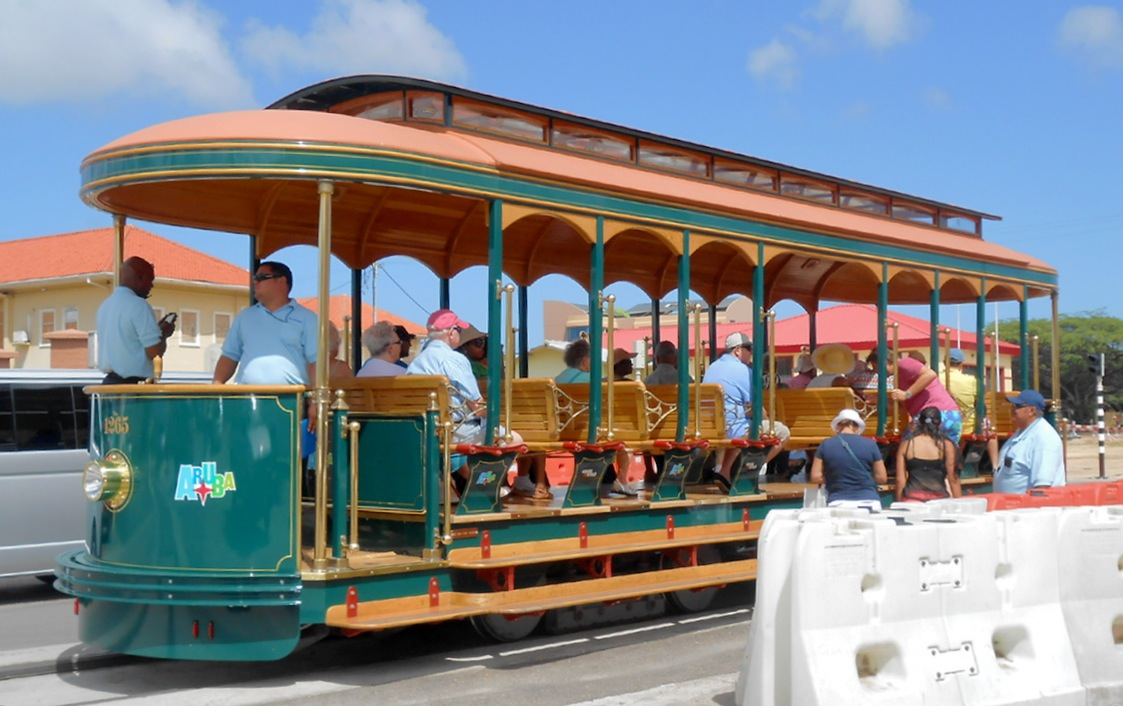
Single-deck tram in 2014

== See also ==
- List of town tramway systems in North America
- Queen Beatrix International Airport
- Transport in Aruba
