= Arubus N.V. =

Arubus
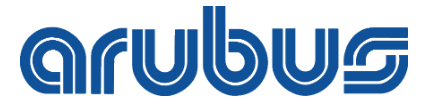
- Logo

Overview
- Owner: Government of Aruba
- Transit type: Bus, Tram
- Annual ridership: 1,129,944 (2021)
- Website: https://arubus.com/

Arubus, officially known as Arubus N.V. is the public transport agency of Aruba. It operates 15 regular service bus routes and 22 school service bus routes; with nine morning routes and 11 afternoon routes. It is owned by the government of Aruba. It also co-operates a tram line servicing downtown Oranjestad, the capital of Aruba. Service hours operate from 3:30 a.m. until 12:30 a.m. Arubus also owns two bus terminals in Oranjestad, and San Nicolas.

As per the Central Bureau of Statistics (CBS), the number of registered buses has remained relatively stable from 2015 to 2021. In 2015, there were 129 registered buses, and this number increased to 140 by 2021. In contrast to buses, the count of registered tour buses, has experienced a rapid increase, growing from 94 to 312.

Data from the CBS indicates a decline in the total number of bus passengers (excluding school children) from 2010 to 2021. In 2010, a total of 2,719,083 passengers were transported, whereas in 2021, the number decreased to 1,129,944.

A regular fare is $2.60 (USD) or $4.50 (AWG), but the commission issues a special public-transport card named SMARTCARD, offering discounts on fares and varies by type for students, seniors, and regular riders.

== Bus routes ==
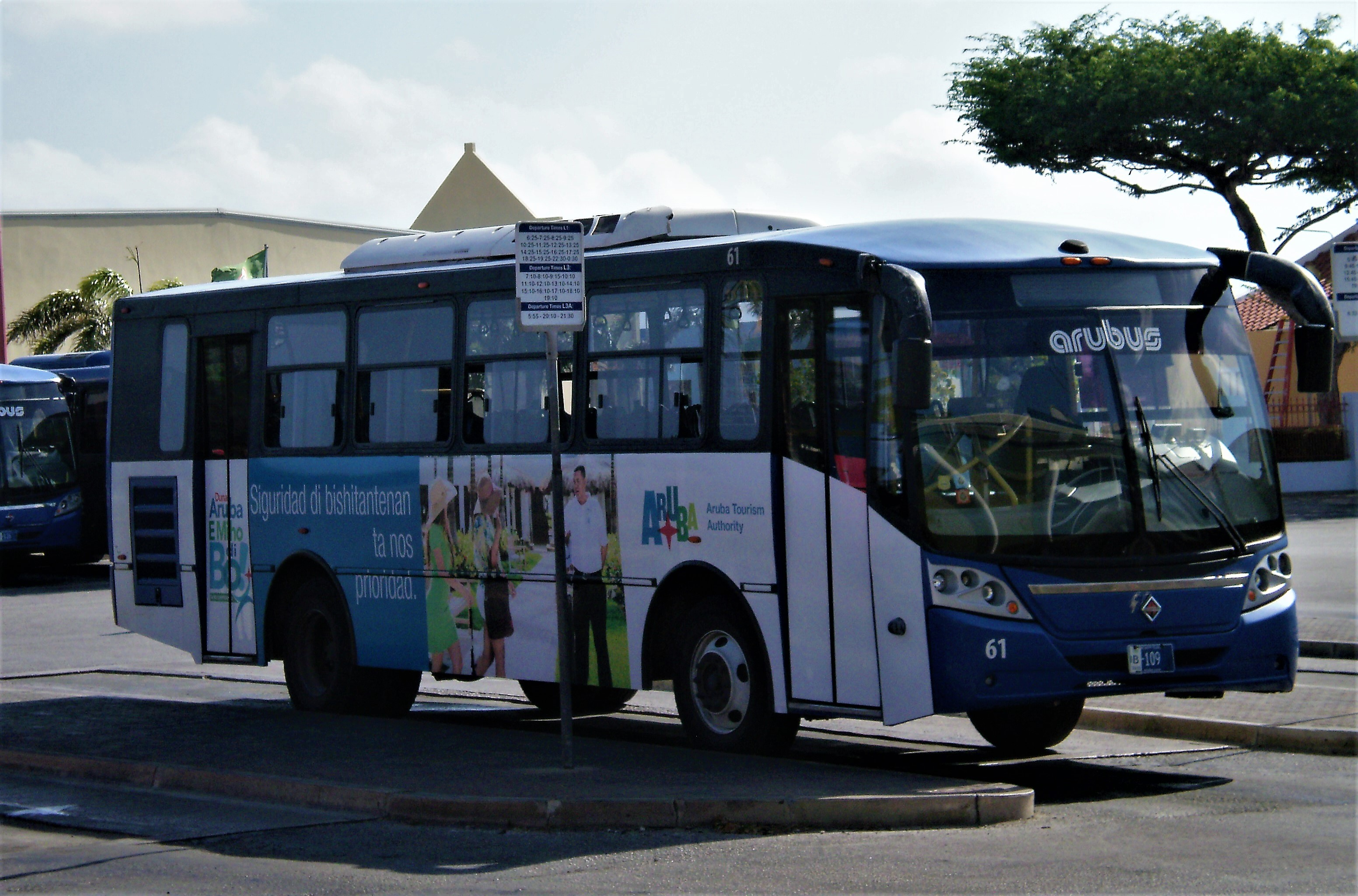
A bus en route

Regular bus routes are labelled as L[#], while school trippers are labelled S[#]. Although many stops are unnamed, they all retain numbers.

Bus Route	Direction of Travel
L1	Northbound: San Nicolas - Oranjestad Southbound: Oranjestad - San Nicolas
L2	Northbound: San Nicolas - Oranjestad via Caya Jose Geerman & Dakota Southbound: Oranjestad - San Nicolas via Dakota, Caya Jose Geerman & Lago Heights
L3A	Northbound: San Nicolas - Oranjestad via Lago Heights, Pastoor Hendrikstraat, Cura Cabai, Savaneta, St. Cruz & Cumana Southbound: Oranjestad - San Nicolas via Cumana, Santa Cruz & Bernhardstraat
L5	Northbound: Oranjestad - Macuarima Southbound: Macuarima - Oranjestad
L7	Northbound: Oranjestad - Marriot/ Marriott Oranjestad Southbound: Marriot/ Marriott Oranjestad - Oranjestad
L7A	Northbound: Oranjestad - Marriot/ Marriott Oranjestad (Fewer Stops) Southbound: Marriot/ Marriott Oranjestad - Oranjestad
L8	Northbound: Sabana Basora - Oranjestad Southbound: Oranjestad - Sabana Basora Sur
L10A	Northbound: Oranjestad - Arashi Southbound: Arashi - Oranjestad
L10B	Northbound: Oranjestad - Marriott Southbound: Marriott - Oranjestad
L10C	Northbound: Oranjestad - Arashi via HOH (Dr Horacio Oduber Hospital) Southbound: Arashi - Oranjestad via HOH (Dr Horacio Oduber Hospital)
L11 (Limited Stop Express Route)	Northbound: San Nicolas - Marriott - Oranjestad (Non Stop)

== Oranjestad Tram ==
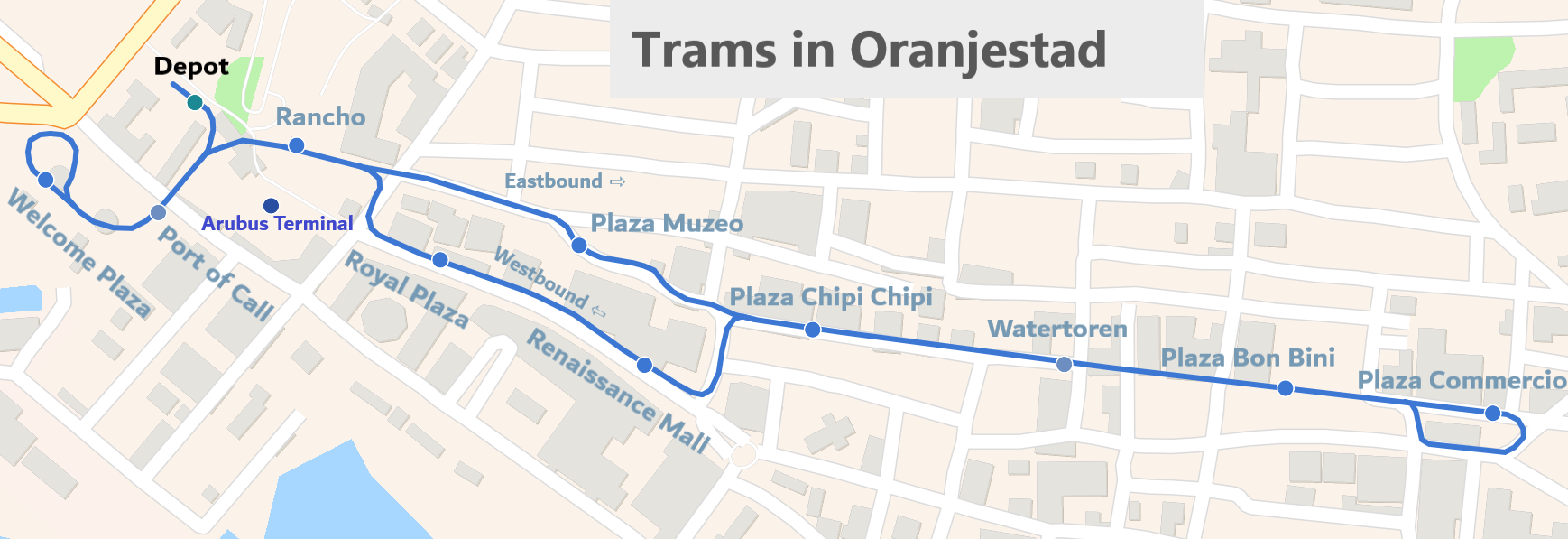
Route map

The Oranjestad Tram, also sometimes called Arutram, is tram line in Oranjestad, with its rolling stock being powered by hydrogen. It was built as a key component of a larger project to upgrade the main retail areas of the town, other aspects of which included pedestrianization of streets, planting of trees, installation of ornamental street lighting and resurfacing of streets and sidewalks. It runs from the Port of Call, the arrival and departure terminal for tourist ferries to Plaza Commercio. There are 8 regular service stops, with 2 additional stops in the Port of Call and on Waterweg. The depot is located west of Rancho. The line does a loop around commercial areas and the Renaissance Mall.

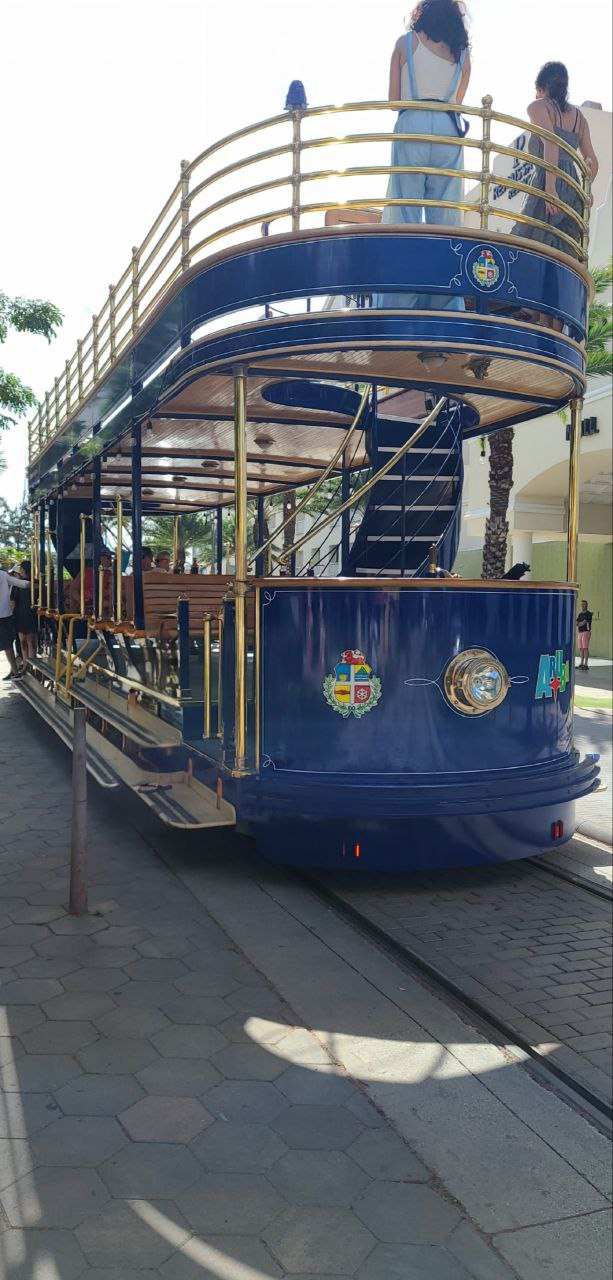
A tram at the Royal Plaza

Station	Notes
Welcome Plaza	Port
Port of Call	Morning service stop, touring bus station
Rancho	Oranjestad Bus Terminal, tram depot
Plaza Museo	Eastbound service, Archaeological Museum
Royal Plaza	Westbound service
Renaissance Mall	Westbound service, Renaissance Mall
Plaza Chipi Chipi/Mango Plaza	Also named "Mango Plaza"
Caya Betico Croes/Watertoren	Near Aruba Bank, additional stop, name not yet defined, sometimes called Watertoren
Plaza Bon Bini	2 rail tracks before the station
Plaza Nicky/Plaza Comercio	Also named "Plaza Comercio", loop
