= Barcadera =

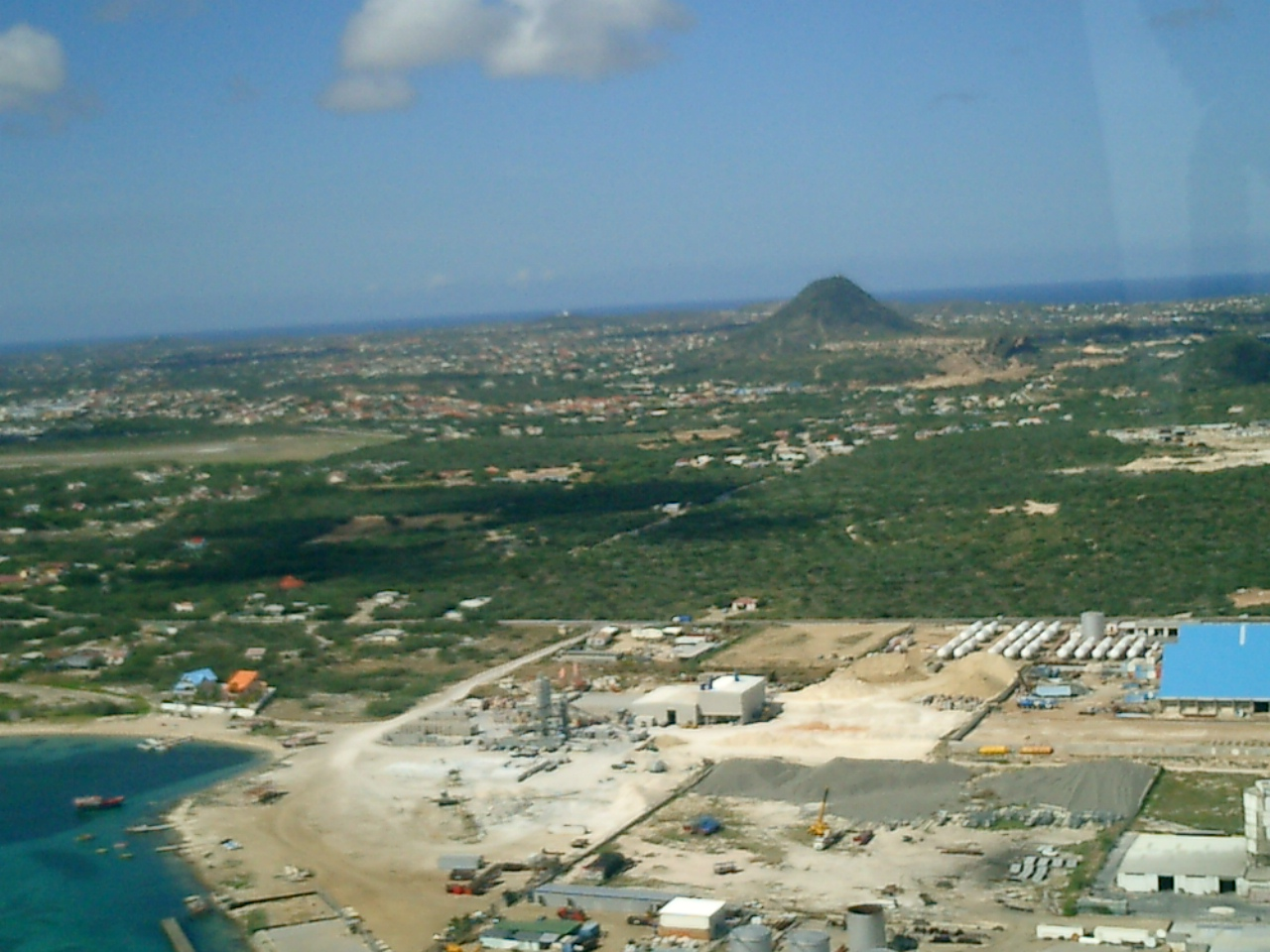
- Aerial view of Barcadera (2004)
- Interactive map of Barcadera
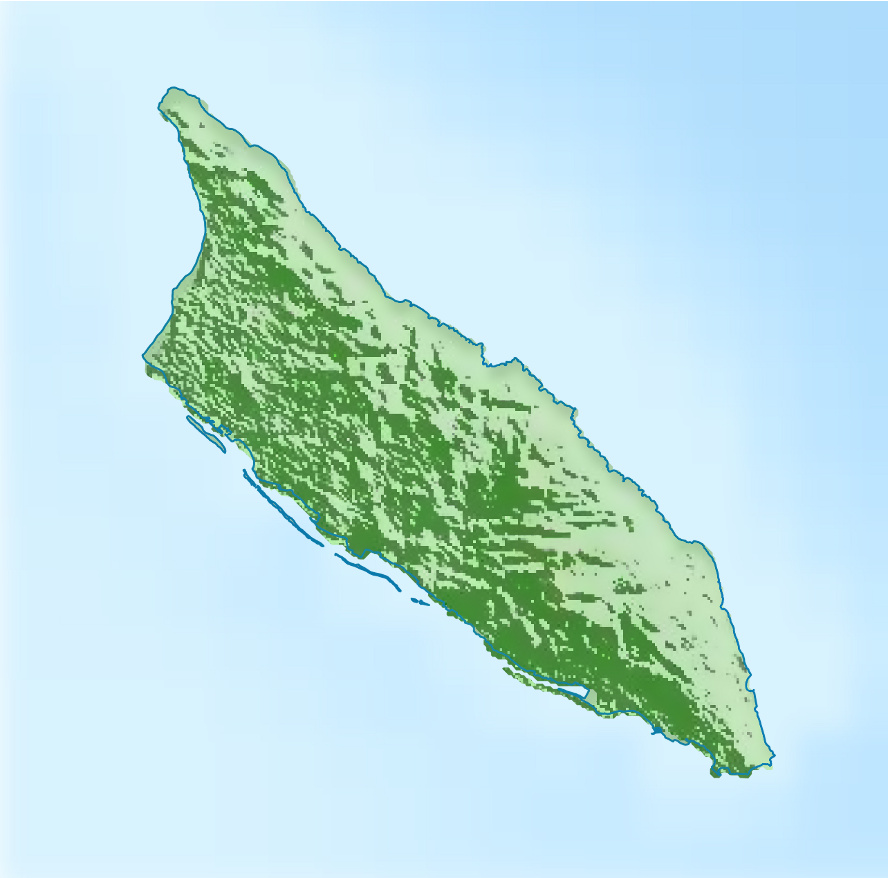
- Location in Aruba

Location
- Country: Aruba
- Location: Oranjestad, Aruba
- Coordinates: 12.48202°N 69.99156°W

Details
- Opened: 12 April 2016
- Operated by: Aruba Ports Authority

Barcadera is the main seaport for cargo ships in Aruba. It is located in Barcadera, district Santa Cruz and was officially opened on 12 April 2016. The seaport is operated by Aruba Stevedoring (ASTEC) Company N.V., a private entity established by nine local shareholders (all N.V.'s). This initiative was part of the effort to upgrade and modernize the port of Aruba to accommodate the increasing containerization of cargo.

== History ==
Plans to create the harbour began in 1994. The harbour at Oranjestad was large enough, however the cargo ships had to share the port with cruise ships which often caused problems. The first priority was to move the container terminal. Work began in 2011, and the move was completed in 2015. On 12 April 2016, the Barcadera harbour was officially opened by Prime minister Mike Eman.

The existing harbour at Oranjestad needed to be dredged. The dredging started in 2018, and the sand was used to reclaim 500 hectares (1,200 acres) of land extending the Barcadera terminal.

== Free zone ==
A part of the harbour has been designated a free zone. It is one of two free zones in Aruba. For licensed companies engaging in sustainable projects, there are 0% import duties and other taxes, and a 2% profit tax.
