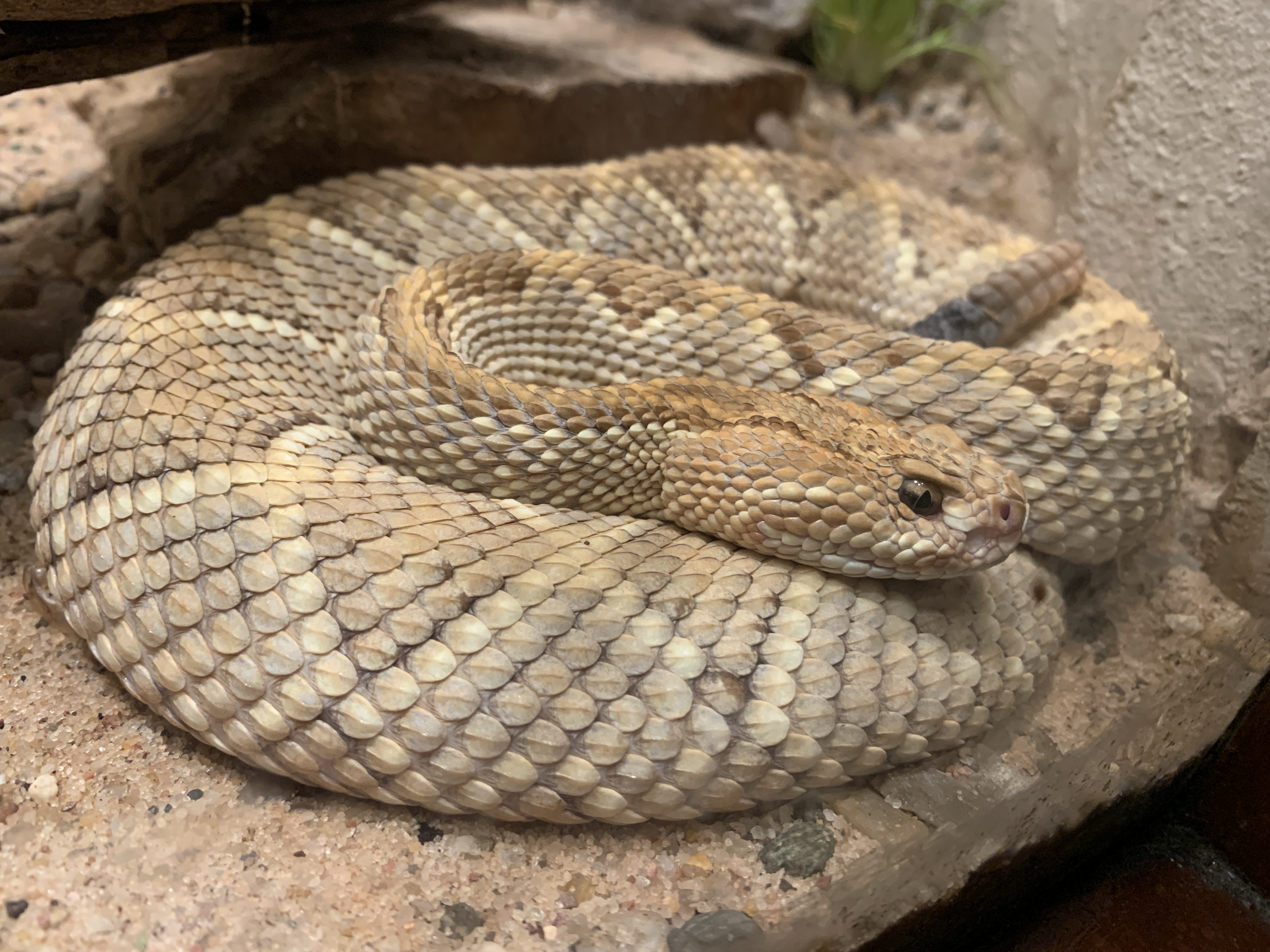
- Bronx Zoo

Scientific classification
- Kingdom: Animalia
- Phylum: Chordata
- Class: Reptilia
- Order: Squamata
- Suborder: Serpentes
- Family: Viperidae
- Genus: Crotalus
- Species: C. unicolor

Binomial name
- Crotalus unicolor van Lidth de Jeude, 1887

Synonyms
- Crotalus horridus var. unicolor - van Lidth de Jeude, 1887; Crotalus unicolor - Klauber, 1936; Crotalus durissus unicolor - Brongersma, 1940; Crotalus (Crotalus) durissus unicolor - Peters & Orejas-Miranda, 1970; Crotalus unicolor - McCranie, 1986; Crotalus durissus unicolor - Campbell & Lamar, 1989

= Crotalus unicolor =

Aruba rattlesnake

Species of snake

Common names: Aruba rattlesnake, Aruba island rattlesnake, Cascabel (Papiamento).

The Aruba Island rattlesnake (Crotalus unicolor), is a venomous pit viper species endemic to the Caribbean island of Aruba, off the coast of Venezuela. It is sometimes still classified as a subspecies of Crotalus durissus.

== Description ==
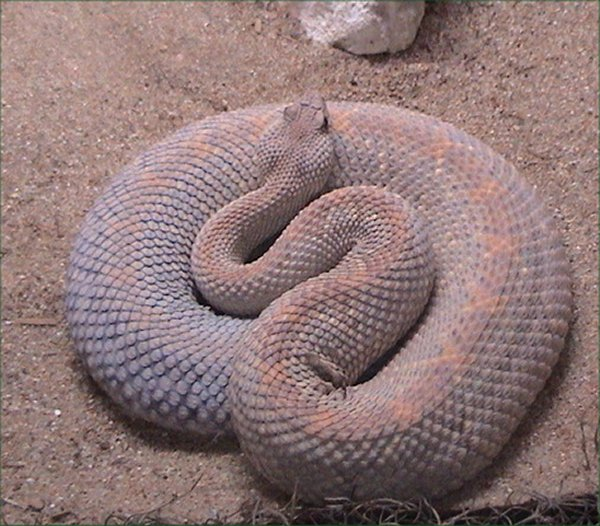
Aruba Island rattlesnake

Moderately sized, this species attains an adult length of approximately 90 cm (35 in), and weighs about 1 kilogram (2.2 lb). It is light brown, tan, or almost pink in color, reflecting the soil color of its native habitat, with darker brown diamond-shaped markings, but colors may vary from white to apricot, or brown to slate. The markings are sometimes nearly invisible, or can only be seen in a narrow stripe down the middle of the back.

== Geographic range ==
This species is only found on the island of Aruba, making it an endemic species. They exist only in thornscrub and desert habitats on the southeastern half of the island.

== Conservation status ==
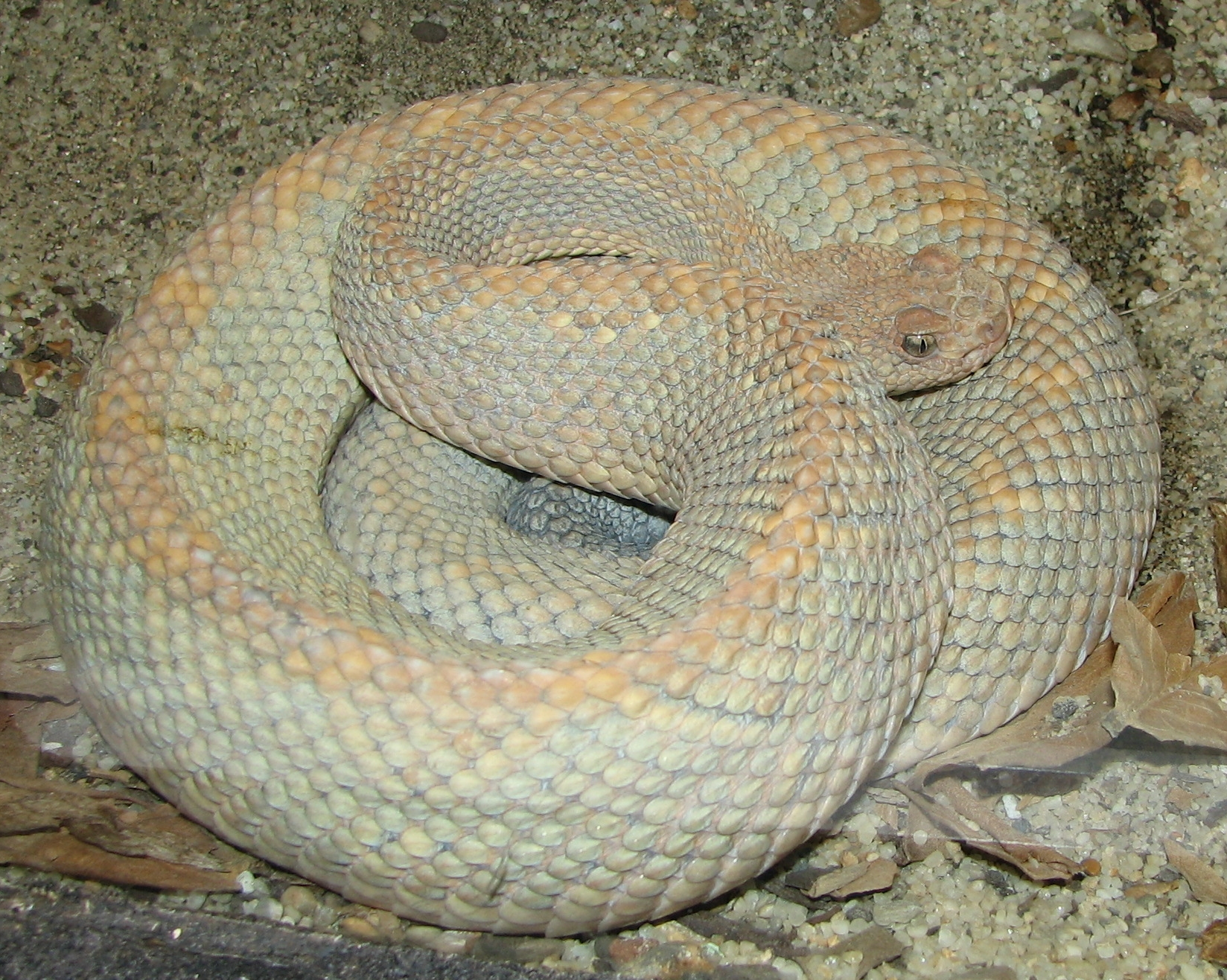
C. unicolor in captivity

These snakes are found only on the island of Aruba, where they are mostly limited to the rocky, dry southern tip of the island. Due to their extremely limited geographic range, about 230 animals are left in the wild, and the ever encroaching human habitation into their territory (with only about 25 square kilometers left undeveloped), the Aruba Island rattlesnake is among the rarest rattlesnakes in the world. While exporting from the island is illegal, it has no other legal protection on the island either. The snake is now a part of the Species Survival Plan for captive breeding.

== Diet ==
Specimens consume various species of rodents, birds, and lizards.

== Reproduction ==
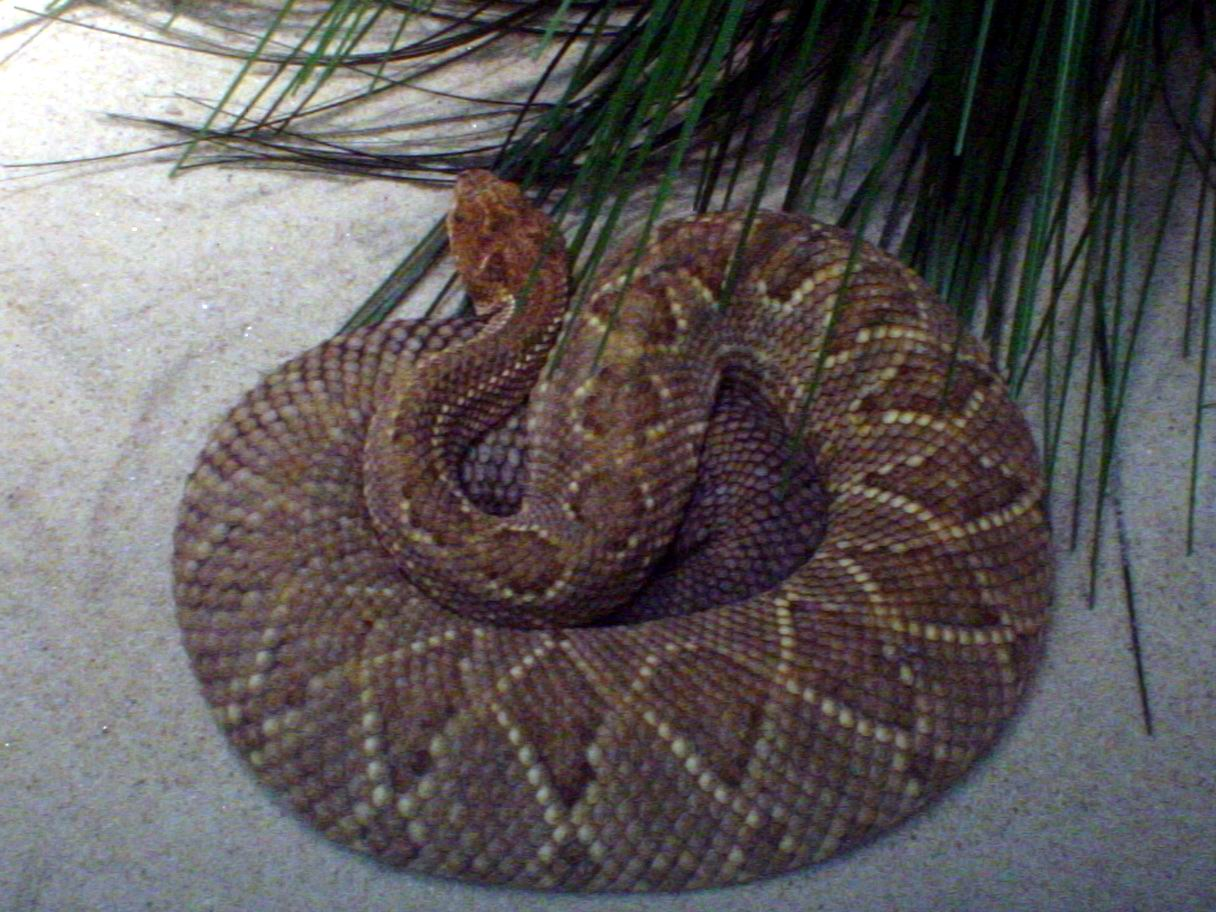
Crotalus unicolor at the Columbus Zoo and Aquarium

Males reach sexual maturity in four years; females in five. After a gestation period of four months, females give birth to between five and fifteen live young at a time.
