= Economy of Aruba =

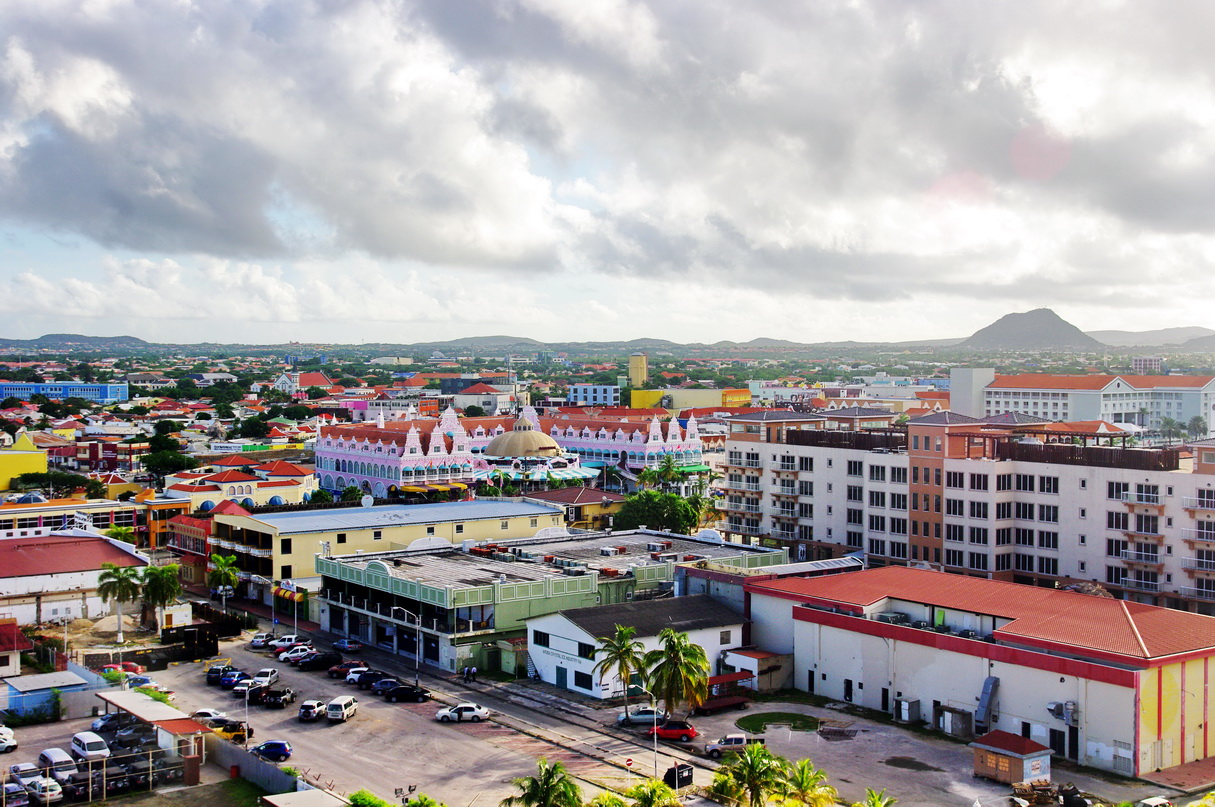
- Centre of Oranjestad in 2011.
- Currency: Aruban florin (AWG); 1 US$ = 1.80 AWG (Jan. 2025)
- Fiscal year: Calendar year
- Country group: Developed/Advanced; High-income economy

Statistics
- GDP: ▲$4.45 billion (nominal, 2025 est.); ▲$5.9 billion (PPP, 2025 est.)
- GDP growth: 0.5% (2016) 2.3% (2017); 1.2% (2018e) 0.7% (2019e)
- GDP per capita: ▲$41,498 (nominal, 2025 est.); ▲$55,056 (PPP, 2025 est.)
- GDP by sector: agriculture: 0.4%, industry: 33.3%, services: 66.3% (2002 est.)
- Inflation (CPI): 3.579% (2018)
- Population below national poverty line: N/A%
- Labour force: 51,610 (2007 est.)
- Labour force by occupation: agriculture: NA%, industry: NA%, services: NA%
- Unemployment: 6.9% (2005 est.)
- Main industries: tourism, petroleum transshipment facilities, and banking

External
- Exports: $312.7 million (2014 est.)
- Export goods: live animals and animal products, art and collectibles, machinery and electrical equipment, and transport equipment
- Main export partners: United States 41.9% Colombia 17.9% Venezuela 13.5% Panama 10.8% Netherlands 8.1% (2015 est.)
- Imports: $1.528 billion (2014 est.)
- Import goods: machinery and electrical equipment, refined oil for bunkering and re-export, chemicals; and foodstuffs
- Main import partners: United States 53.2% Venezuela 14.9% Mexico 10.5% Netherlands 7.7% Canada 6.2% (2015 est.)

Public finance
- Government debt: $533.4 million (2005 est.)
- All values, unless otherwise stated, are in US dollars.

The economy of Aruba is classified as a high income economy by the World Bank, with tourism currently providing the largest percentage of the country's income. Because of tourism's rapid growth on the island in the last 80 years, related industries like construction have also flourished in Aruba. Other primary industries include oil refining and storage, as well as offshore banking. Aloe cultivation, livestock, and fishing also contribute to Aruba's economy. In addition, the country also exports art and collectibles, machinery, electrical equipment, and transport equipment. Aruba's small labor force and low unemployment rate have led to many unfilled job vacancies, despite sharp rises in wage rates in recent years.

Aruba boasts one of the highest standards of living and highest GDP per capitas in the Caribbean, with a low unemployment rate and a strong economy. Having well-developed infrastructure and high economic output. With such a large part of its economy dependent on tourism, the island has been seeking ways to diversify its economy to reduce its reliance on the industry and prevent economic shutdowns like that seen in 2020. Their current focus is on expanding into the cannabis and hemp industry, transitioning to a circular economy, creating an internal economy in the primary sector, technology, and finance.

== History ==
Unlike many Caribbean islands, a plantation economy never developed on Aruba due to its arid climate. Early Spanish explorers considered the island of little value, partly because the poor soil made growing crops difficult and partly because their attempts to find gold turned up empty-handed. However, long after the Dutch obtained control of Aruba, they found the gold the Spanish had been seeking.

=== Gold ===
With the discovery of gold on Aruba in 1800, mining became the island's foremost industry. Aruba's economy boomed. However, by 1916 the gold supply had mostly been tapped out, making it impossible for companies to turn a profit. As the gold mining industry waned, so did the economy.

=== Aloe ===
First planted on Aruba in 1850, aloes thrive in its desert conditions. With a healthy demand for aloe products, it became an important part of Aruba's economy. In fact, for many years, the country was aloe's top exporter. But over the years, many aloe fields were replaced by buildings, diminishing its production and exports declined.

The oldest company on the island, Aruba Aloe, has recently instituted changes in the hopes of becoming Aruba's leading product manufacturer. It built a new, modern facility, an aloe museum, and designed new packaging. Although most of their product line sells in the national market, a 2005 exporting deal with a U.S. company and sales through their website have increased their international market.

=== Oil ===
Despite setbacks caused by the troubled gold and aloe industries, Aruba's economy didn't suffer long. Because of its location near Venezuela, the island became an attractive spot for oil refineries. The Lago Oil and Transport Company, owned by Standard Oil of New Jersey (now Exxon), opened in 1929 near the transshipping port of San Nicolaas. Following in their footsteps, the Eagle Oil refinery opened soon after in Oranjestad. By early 1939, a more consistent supply of crude oil was achieved, allowing the refineries to operate at full capacity. Over the next few decades, the oil industry took over as Aruba's primary economic force.

With the United States entry into World War II in 1942 the demand for aviation gasoline further increased and considerable expansion was done at the Lago refinery soon after the United States entered the war. With this expansion, Lago became one of the largest refineries in the world, only bested by Royal Dutch Shell Isla refinery on Curaçao, and a major producer of petroleum products for the Allied war efforts. The importance of the Lago refinery was well known to the German High Command and on February 16, 1942 the Lago refinery was attacked by the German submarine U-156. Due to mistakes by the German deck gunner the refinery was not damaged but three of the Lago tankers were torpedoed in San Nicolaas harbour.

The Eagle Oil refinery shut down and was dismantled in the late 1950s. But the Lago refinery kept going until 1985, when the demand for oil fell and Exxon closed it. In 1991, the Coastal Corporation bought it, scaled down operations, and reopened it. Coastal later sold the refinery to Valero Energy Corporation in 2004. Its reopening didn't raise Aruba's oil industry to its previous heights although it did revive that sector and continued to be a key contributor to the country's economy until 2009 when it was closed. In December 2010, Valero Energy announced plans to reopen the refinery.

=== Tourism ===
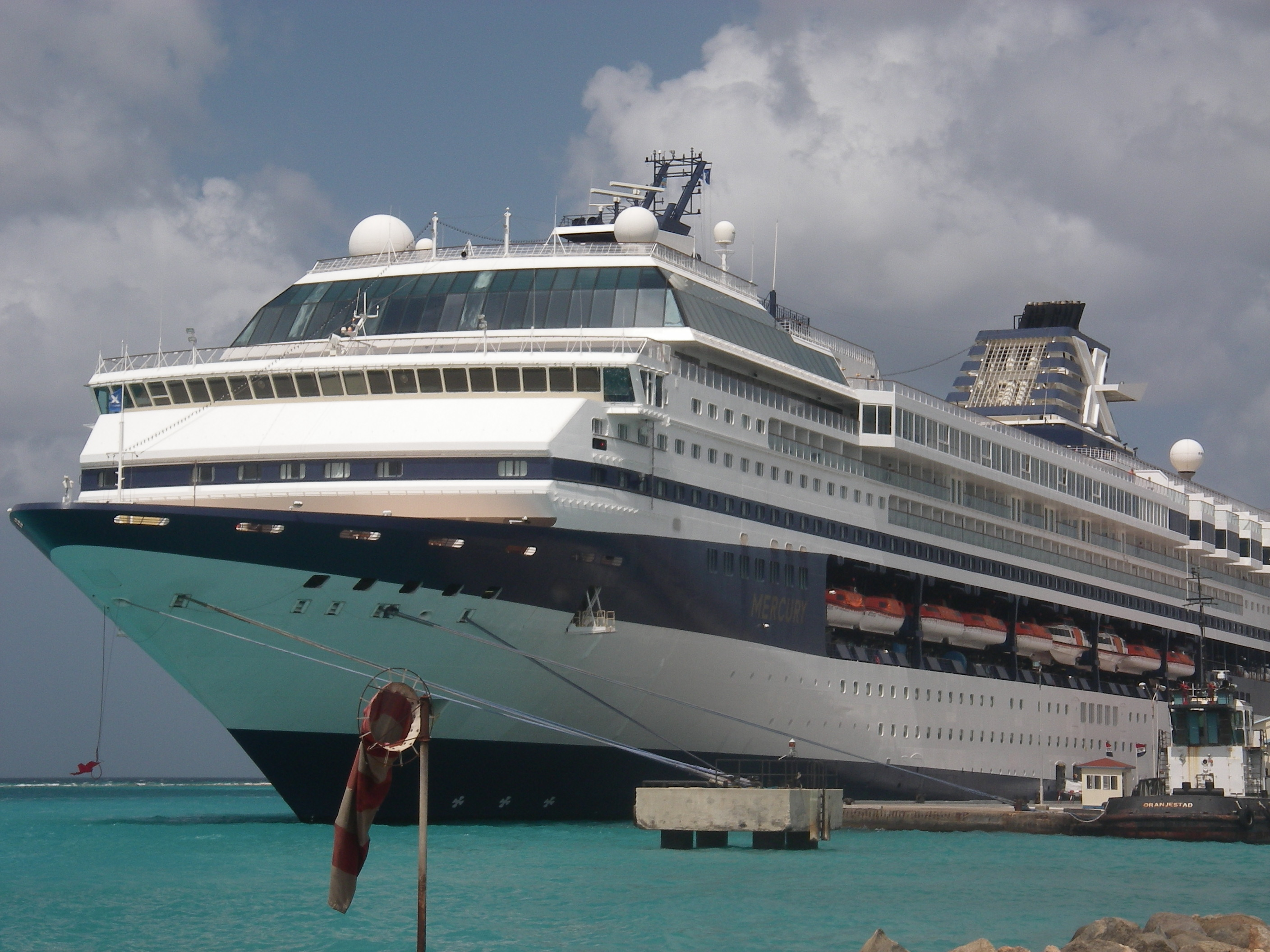
The cruise ship Celebrity Mercury docked in Oranjestad.

In 1947, Aruba's government founded a tourist board to explore the possibility of developing a tourism industry. Several years later, cruise ships began to dock in Oranjestad, Aruba's capital city. The island's first luxury hotel was built in 1959, giving the fledgling industry a good start. Over the years, tourism grew and helped create a prosperous economy.

As the oil industry waned, tourism increased in importance. The government offered fiscal incentives to spur growth of hotels and other tourist-oriented businesses. Their efforts resulted in a steady and rapid rise in tourism. When a surplus of these jobs couldn't be filled, they placed a one-year moratorium on new hotel construction and new tourist corporations.

Following the September 11 attacks, tourism temporarily declined because of grounded flights and travel fears. Aruba stepped up its visible security force in tourist areas to heighten safety and reassure visitors. After a short time, tourism rebounded strongly.

Another potential threat to the industry occurred in 2005, when the May 30 disappearance of vacationing Alabama teen Natalee Holloway made international news. Claiming that Aruban authorities weren't taking the case seriously enough, her mother and the Governor of Alabama called for a nationwide boycott of Aruba. However, the U.S. federal government didn't back the proposed boycott. Aruba's reputation as one of the safest islands in the Caribbean may have helped it overcome any negative stigma caused by the case. The amount of tourism in June 2005 actually rose by 9% from the previous year.

== Transport ==
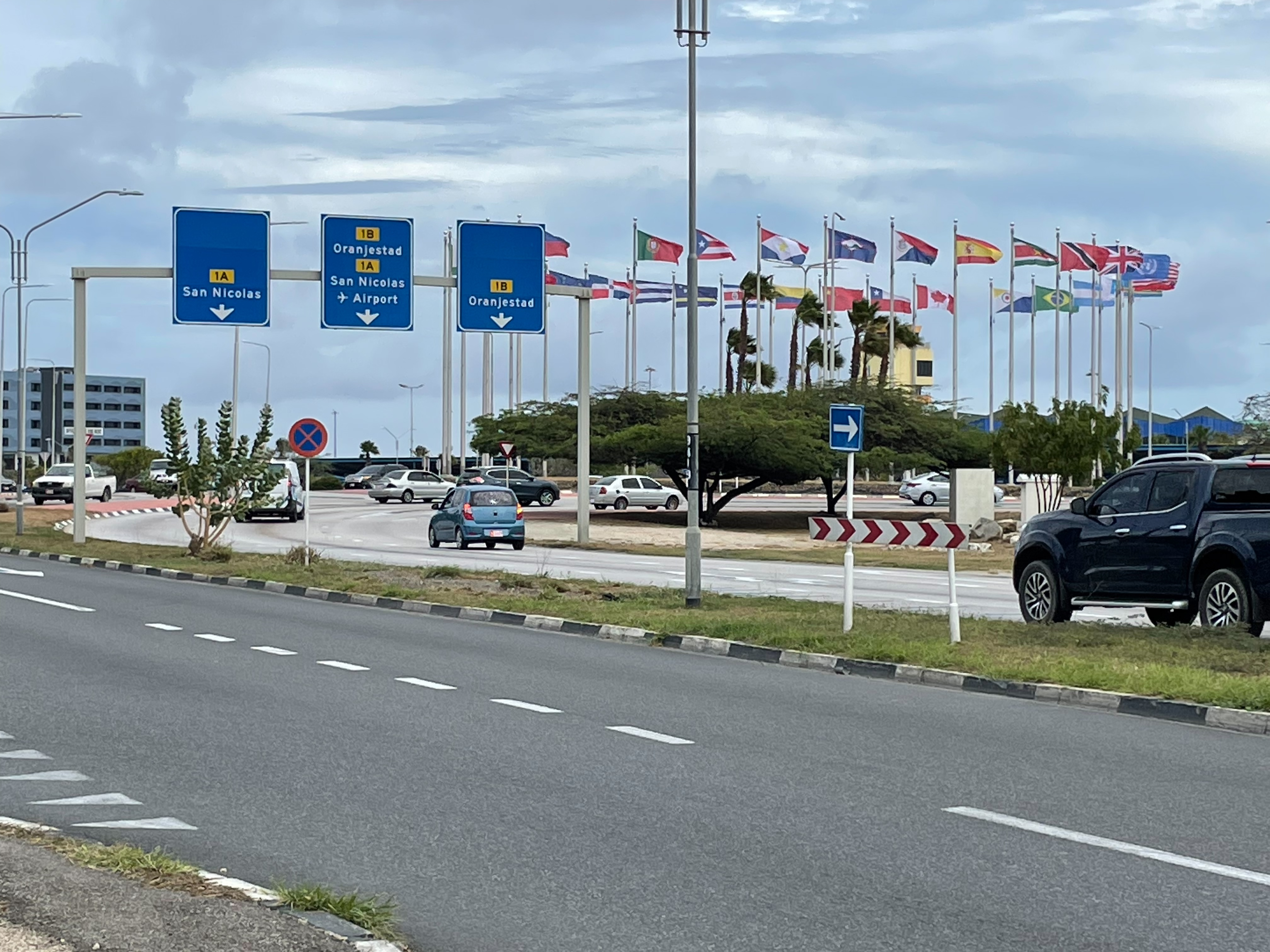
Road infrastructure with a turbo roundabout near Queen Beatrix International Airport (2021)

Transport in Aruba is facilitated by road, air, and rail. Aruba features a well-established road network, with the majority of the roads being paved. However, as one ventures towards the interior of the island, the prevalence of paved roads decreases, giving way to more rugged terrain. Conversely, coastal areas typically offer-well maintained paved roads. Aruba's road network covers a total distance of about 998 kilometres (620 mi), with 361 kilometres (220 mi) remaining unpaved.

== See also ==
- Economy of the Caribbean
- Aruban florin
- Central Bank of Aruba
- Central banks and currencies of the Caribbean
- Euronext
- List of countries by credit rating
- List of Latin American and Caribbean countries by GDP growth
- List of Latin American and Caribbean countries by GDP (nominal)
- List of Latin American and Caribbean countries by GDP (PPP)
- List of countries by tax revenue as percentage of GDP
- List of countries by future gross government debt
- List of countries by leading trade partners
