= Aruba: The Tragic Untold Story of Natalee Holloway and Corruption in Paradise =

2006 book by Dave Holloway, R. Stephanie Good, and Larry Garrison

- 1st edition hardcover
- Author: Dave Holloway; R. Stephanie Good; Larry Garrison
- Language: English
- Subject: True crime
- Publisher: Thomas Nelson
- Publication date: April 11, 2006
- Publication place: United States
- Pages: 240
- ISBN: 978-1-59555-063-7
- OCLC: 63472537
- Dewey Decimal: 362.8 22
- LC Class: HV6762.A75 H65 2006

Aruba: The Tragic Untold Story of Natalee Holloway and Corruption in Paradise is an autobiographical true crime book by Dave Holloway about his experiences searching for his missing daughter Natalee Holloway, co-written with R. Stephanie Good and Larry Garrison. It was released on April 11, 2006, by the Thomas Nelson publishing company.

== Summary ==
The book covers Holloway's ongoing effort to locate his daughter Natalee, who disappeared during a high school graduation trip to Aruba in 2005. He details his experience following leads in crack houses and personally searching landfills. He alleges corruption among the Aruba Police Force, recalling that upon arrival on the island, they asked him how much money he had.

I am a father who has no idea what has happened to his child. The questions run through my mind all day long. Is she dead? Is she being held captive somewhere? Is she crying out for me?

— Dave Holloway

Holloway accused suspect Joran van der Sloot of repeatedly lying and believes that he is "guilty of something."

== Background ==
Dave Holloway stated that he started taking notes in a journal by the second week of the search in Aruba for his daughter because of inconsistencies in the witness accounts of her disappearance. He felt that authorities were trying to close the investigation because of concern that it would tarnish the island's image as a tourist destination.

He said that he met journalists and other people who suggested writing a book, but he at first declined. Holloway decided to proceed after he saw what was being posted on the internet. He wrote the book in the hope that it would help solve the mystery. Though his ex-wife Beth has conceded that their daughter may be dead, Holloway stated that he has been unable to come to terms with that scenario.

== Reception ==
Soon after its release in April 2006, the book was on The New York Times best seller list for four weeks in a row. Holloway said that he did not write the book for monetary gain and that any funds not spent on the investigation would be given to charity.

== See also ==
- De zaak Natalee Holloway by Joran van der Sloot
- Loving Natalee: A Mother's Testament of Hope and Faith by Beth Holloway
- Overboord: hoe ik Joran van der Sloot aan het praten kreeg by Patrick van der Eem
