= Loving Natalee =

Book by Beth Holloway

Loving Natalee: A Mother's Testament of Hope and Faith
- First edition hardcover
- Author: Beth Holloway; Sunny Tillman (contributor)
- Language: English, Dutch
- Subject: Autobiography
- Publisher: HarperOne (English); Schuyt & Co. (Dutch)
- Publication date: October 2, 2007 (hardcover, e-book); March 2008 (Dutch paperback); April 28, 2009 (English paperback)
- Publication place: United States
- Pages: 256
- ISBN: 978-0-06-145227-7
- OCLC: 154702068
- Dewey Decimal: 363.2336 22
- LC Class: HV6762.A75 H66 2007

Loving Natalee: A Mother's Testament of Hope and Faith is an autobiography written by Beth Holloway about her missing daughter Natalee Holloway, with portions contributed by Sunny Tillman. It was first published in October 2007 by HarperOne, an imprint of HarperCollins, and has also been marketed under its alternate subtitle The True Story of the Aruba Kidnapping and Its Aftermath.

== Background ==
Holloway said that she vowed to share her story shortly following her daughter's disappearance, in the hope that other families would not suffer what she had to go through. After five months of unsuccessfully searching on Aruba, her attorney John Q. Kelly took over the case and she spent the next two years traveling to various high schools and colleges to present messages about personal safety. When she thought about reaching more travelers with her story, Holloway said that her efforts evolved into writing a book.

== Summary ==
The book retells events leading up to the night Natalee Holloway disappeared during a high school graduation trip to Aruba in 2005, and the ensuing investigation in the aftermath. It then focuses on the obstacles faced by the Holloway-Twitty family in their search for Natalee's whereabouts. Holloway recounts her anger at what she felt was a lack of cooperation from local authorities such as the Aruba Police Force, including the failure to obtain a warrant to search the home of suspect Joran van der Sloot.

== Editions ==
The first hardcover edition and e-book were published on October 2, 2007. A paperback edition was published on April 28, 2009, under the alternate title Loving Natalee: The True Story of the Aruba Kidnapping and Its Aftermath and includes additional material. The hardcover and paperback versions both contain 256 pages. A Dutch language version, titled Lieve Natalee: het ware verhaal over Natalee Holloway, was released in March 2008 by Schuyt & Co.

== Promotion and reception ==
Excerpts from the book were previewed in Good Housekeeping magazine. It was later promoted during an interview with Holloway on The Oprah Winfrey Show. Soon after its initial release in October 2007, the book was on The New York Times Best Seller list.

Dennis Lythgoe of Deseret News, noting that the book was ghostwritten, remarked that it was "not very well-written", but complimented it as "a compelling glimpse of this mother's electric personality."

== Film adaptation ==
In October 2008, the Lifetime Movie Network announced plans to create a television film title based on the book. The senior vice president of original movies, Tanya Lopez, stated in the announcement that the network was "pleased to be working closely with Natalee's mother" and that they intended to tell the story of Holloway's disappearance "sensitively and accurately." Jarett Wieselman of the New York Post questioned whether it was too soon for such a film to be made.

The April 19, 2009 broadcast of Natalee Holloway attracted 3.2 million viewers, garnering the highest television ratings in the network's 11-year history. Although it set ratings records for Lifetime, the movie was not received well by critic Alec Harvey of The Birmingham News. Harvey called the movie "sloppy and uneven, a forgettable look at the tragedy that consumed the nation's attention for months". However, Jake Meaney of PopMatters found the film to be surprisingly "calm and levelheaded", and praised Tracy Pollan's portrayal of Holloway's mother. Joran van der Sloot himself watched the film one evening in 2010, according to his friend John Ludwick, and said that some parts were true while others were not.

== See also ==
- Aruba: The Tragic Untold Story of Natalee Holloway and Corruption in Paradise by Dave Holloway
- De zaak Natalee Holloway by Joran van der Sloot
- Overboord: hoe ik Joran van der Sloot aan het praten kreeg by Patrick van der Eem
