= De zaak Natalee Holloway =

2007 discredited Dutch memoir

De zaak Natalee Holloway The Case of Natalee Holloway
- Author: Joran van der Sloot; Zvezdana Vukojevic
- Language: Dutch
- Genre: Autobiography, true crime
- Publisher: Sijthoff
- Publication date: April 1, 2007
- Publication place: Netherlands
- Pages: 350
- ISBN: 978-90-218-0014-1
- OCLC: 150235828

De zaak Natalee Holloway: mijn eigen verhaal over haar verdwijning op Aruba (English: The Case of Natalee Holloway: My own story about her disappearance in Aruba) is an autobiographical non-fiction book written by Joran van der Sloot with Zvezdana Vukojevic. It was released in 2007 in the Dutch language by Amsterdam-based publisher Sijthoff. An English version was not published.

== Background ==
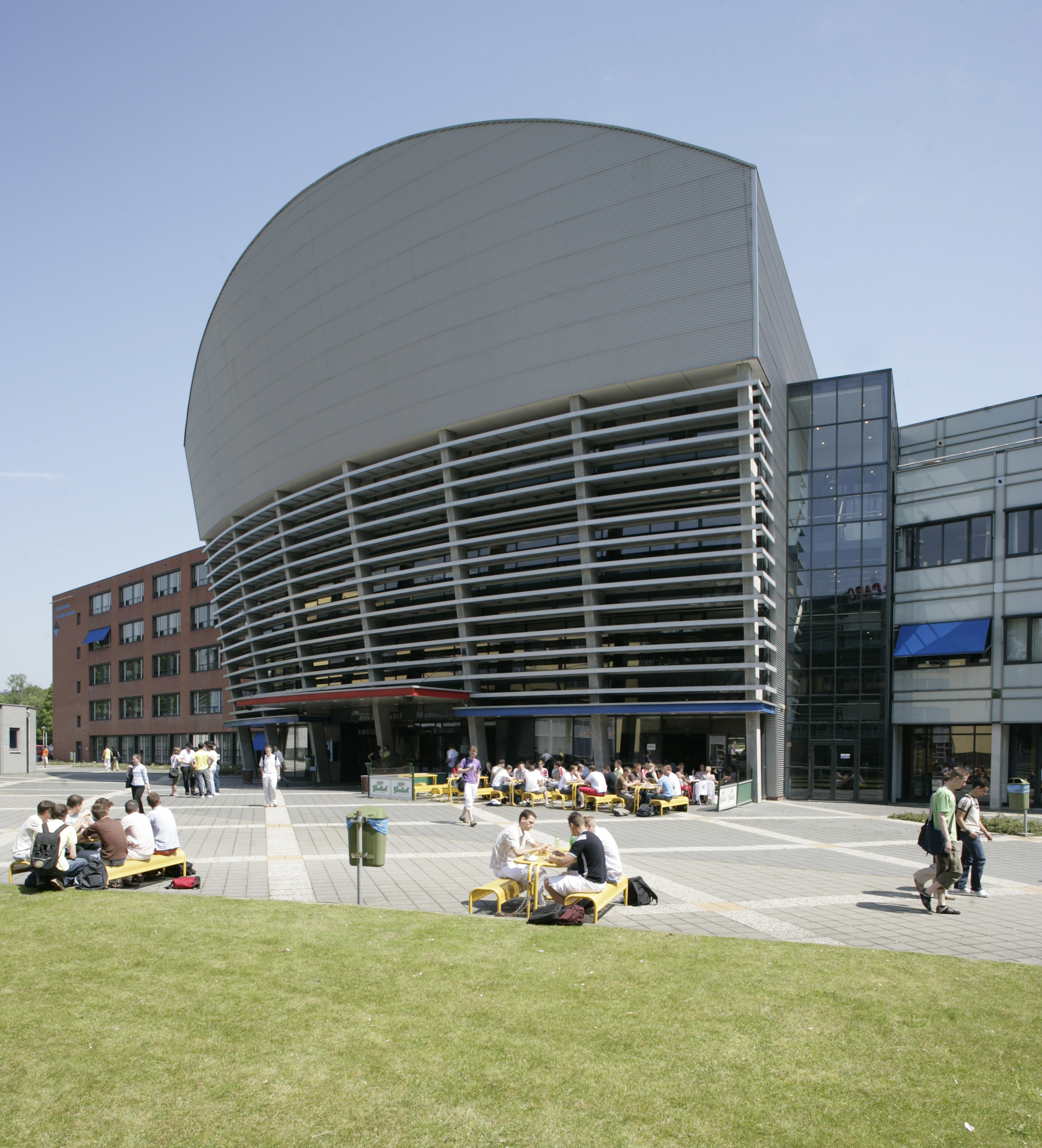
Van der Sloot began writing the book while attending Hogeschool van Arnhem en Nijmegen.

Van der Sloot began writing the book in 2005 with reporter Zvezdana Vukojevic while he was attending business classes at Hogeschool van Arnhem en Nijmegen in the Netherlands, following his release from jail in Aruba in September 2005. He had by then been arrested twice as a suspect related to the disappearance of American student Natalee Holloway.

== Summary ==
In the introduction to the book, Van der Sloot states, "I see this book as my opportunity to be open and honest about everything that happened, for anyone who wants to read it."

The book presents Van der Sloot's account of the night Holloway disappeared and the media frenzy which followed. Details of his encounter with Holloway at the Carlos'n Charlie's nightclub in Oranjestad, Aruba is covered in explicit detail. He admits to lying in the past and apologizes for his actions, stating that he "found himself at the wrong place at the wrong time, and took a wrong decision." However, he insists that he did not break the law and is not a murderer.

I hope every day that Natalee will be found.

— Joran van der Sloot

== Reception and subsequent events ==
Weeks after the book was released on April 1, 2007, a new search involving around twenty investigators was launched at Van der Sloot's parents' home on Aruba. Dutch authorities did not comment on what prompted the new search, except that it was not related to Van der Sloot's book. Natalee's father Dave Holloway said that he did not think the book provided any new information beyond Van der Sloot's original statements that could help the ongoing investigation.

Northeastern University professor Jack Levin stated that a book is an opportunity for suspects of investigations to present their version of events. The Holloway family disputes Van der Sloot's account of Natalee's disappearance and has accused him of being involved.

According to Jossy Mansur, managing editor of Diaro, reaction to the book was mostly negative. A spokesman from Sijthoff stated that the publisher would not release sales figures of books in its catalog, including Van der Sloot's.

== See also ==
- Aruba: The Tragic Untold Story of Natalee Holloway and Corruption in Paradise by Dave Holloway
- Loving Natalee: A Mother's Testament of Hope and Faith by Beth Holloway
- Overboord: hoe ik Joran van der Sloot aan het praten kreeg by Patrick van der Eem
