= Proffer agreement =

Agreement in US criminal law

In United States criminal law, a proffer agreement, proffer letter, proffer, or "Queen for a Day" letter is a written agreement between a prosecutor and a defendant or prospective witness that allows the defendant or witness to give the prosecutor information about an alleged crime, while limiting the prosecutor's ability to use that information against said defendant or witness.

As part of the agreement, the subject may agree to create a statement, known as a proffer statement, setting out their testimony. A meeting in which proffer agreements and statements are negotiated or set out is called a proffer session. The proffer testimony may be recorded as video evidence, in which case it is known as a proffer video.

A proffer does not ensure immunity; however, it often involves a deal for leniency. For instance, a defendant might secure a recommendation for a lighter sentence or other significant advantages in return for providing valuable and truthful information.

== Risks ==
Although the statement from the proffer agreement may not be used by the prosecutors, it often results in discovery of new evidence, which may be used. Many defendants are reluctant to engage in a proffer agreement for this reason.

== Examples ==
Examples of proffer agreements include:

- According to The New York Times, Rudy Giuliani made a proffer agreement with U.S. federal prosecutors in 2023 as part of the January 6 investigation by special counsel Jack Smith
- Former lawyer Kenneth Chesebro made a proffer agreement with prosecutors in the state of Georgia in 2023 in relation to the Georgia election racketeering prosecution, part of Donald Trump's attempt to overturn the 2020 election results. Jenna Ellis and Sidney Powell made proffer videos in the same case.
- Duane 'Keffe D' Davis made a proffer agreement in 2009 in regard to the death of Tupac Shakur
- Joran Van Der Sloot admitted in a proffer letter to killing Natalee Holloway in 2005 as part of a plea deal relating to charges of wire fraud and extortion against Natalee's mother Beth Holloway.

== See also ==
- Witness immunity
