= Carlos Labrada =

Association football player (born 1985)

Personal information
- Full name: Carlos Valentín Labrada Lleras
- Date of birth: December 29, 1985 (age 40)
- Place of birth: Mazatlán, Mexico
- Height: 1.75 m (5 ft 9 in)
- Position: Defender

College career
Years	Team	Apps	(Gls)
2005–2006	Richland Thunderducks	37	(3)

Senior career*
Years	Team	Apps	(Gls)
- UWS Upsetters
- NTX Rayados
- Fort Worth

International career
2016–2018	United States Virgin Islands	5	(0)
- United States Virgin Islands (beach)
- * Club domestic league appearances and goals

Carlos Valentín Labrada Lleras (born December 9, 1985) is a former soccer player who played as a defender. Born in Mexico, he has represented the United States Virgin Islands national team internationally.

== University soccer ==
Labrada represented the soccer team of the Richland College, the Thunderducks, in 2005 and 2006, scoring three goals in thirty-seven appearances.

== Club career ==
Labrada was given the opportunity to move to the United States Virgin Islands to work at the Señor Frog's in Saint Thomas, having worked in their Mazatlán location. While on the island, he played for the UWS Upsetters.

He returned to Texas in the United States, where he played for NTX Rayados and FC Fort Worth.

== International career ==
Labrada was born to a Cuban mother, who gained United States citizenship, making him eligible to represent the United States Virgin Islands, since he also holds American citizenship. He made his senior international debut on 29 March 2016 in a 2–1 defeat to Grenada in Caribbean Cup Qualifying.

He has also represented the United States Virgin Islands in beach soccer.

== Career statistics ==
=== International ===
National team	Year	Apps	Goals
United States Virgin Islands	2016	3	0
United States Virgin Islands	2017	0	0
United States Virgin Islands	2018	2	0
Total		5	0
