= Natalee Holloway (film) =

2009 American film by Mikael Salomon

- DVD cover
- Based on: Loving Natalee: A Mother's Testament of Hope and Faith by Beth Holloway
- Screenplay by: Teena Booth
- Directed by: Mikael Salomon
- Starring: Tracy Pollan; Grant Show; Catherine Dent; Amy Gumenick; Jacques Strydom; Sean Cameron Michael
- Music by: Christopher Ward
- Country of origin: United States
- Original language: English

Production
- Producer: Andrew Golov
- Cinematography: Paul Gilpin
- Editor: Sidney Wolinsky
- Running time: 96 minutes
- Production company: Sony Pictures Television

Original release
- Network: Lifetime Television
- Release: April 19, 2009

Related
- Justice for Natalee Holloway

Natalee Holloway is a 2009 American television film directed by Mikael Salomon based on Beth Holloway's book about the 2005 disappearance of her daughter Natalee Holloway. The film stars Amy Gumenick as Natalee Holloway, Tracy Pollan as Beth Holloway-Twitty and Jacques Strydom as Joran van der Sloot. When it aired on the Lifetime Movie Network on April 19, 2009, the film scored the highest television ratings at that time in the network's history.

== Production ==
In October 2008, the Lifetime Movie Network announced plans to create a television film based on Beth Holloway's bestselling book Loving Natalee: A Mother's Testament of Hope and Faith. The senior vice president of original movies, Tanya Lopez, stated in the announcement that the network was "pleased to be working closely with Natalee's mother" and that they intended to tell the story of Natalee Holloway's disappearance "sensitively and accurately." Jarett Wieselman of the New York Post questioned whether it was too soon for such a film to be made. Holloway said that she was not sure at first that she could take this step, but felt that it was "the right thing to do" after meeting the creative staff in Los Angeles, California. Sara Paxton was first offered the part of Natalee. But Paxton turned down the role feeling it was still too soon after Holloway's disappearance to make a film because it was still being covered in the media. Spencer Redford, was also considered for the role of Natalee.

The film was shot in Cape Town, South Africa, and produced by Sony Pictures Television with Von Zerneck Sertner Films. Holloway's book was adapted for television by Teena Booth, who had previously written A Little Thing Called Murder and Fab Five: The Texas Cheerleader Scandal for Lifetime Television. Holloway said that she was fascinated and at first overwhelmed by the logistics of the production, which she views "as an accomplishment."

== Plot ==
The film retells events leading up to the night of Natalee Holloway's disappearance in Aruba, and the ensuing investigation in the aftermath. The film does not solve the case, but stages re-creations of various scenarios, based on the testimony of key players and suspects, including Joran van der Sloot, who is the last person seen drinking with her and escorting her out of the bar. His contradictory accounts, some presented days and others presented years later, are used to present different reenactments of Holloway's final hours before she went missing. According to the TV movie, Joran drugged Natalee's tequila at the "Carlos'n Charlie's" bar, which killed her when she went into some sort of cardiac arrest as they kissed on a beach. He and an anonymous friend then dumped her body in the ocean from a motorboat, but the film presents the theory that Natalee was still alive when she was dumped.

== Cast ==
- Tracy Pollan as Beth Holloway-Twitty, Natalee's mother
- Wayne Harrison as Dave Holloway, Natalee's father
- Grant Show as George "Jug" Twitty, Natalee's stepfather
- Amy Gumenick as Natalee Holloway, graduating high school student who disappeared in Aruba
- Kai Coetzee as Matt Holloway, Natalee's brother
- Sean Michael as Paul van der Sloot, father of Joran van der Sloot
- Jacques Strydom as Joran van der Sloot, suspect in Natalee's disappearance
- Clayton Evertson as Deepak Kalpoe, friend of Joran van der Sloot
- Cokey Falkow as Patrick van der Eem, working in an undercover investigation
- Catherine Dent as Carol Standifer, friend of Beth Holloway-Twitty

== Broadcast ==
The April 19, 2009 broadcast attracted 3.2 million viewers and more than 1 million women in the 18-49 age group, garnering the highest Nielsen ratings in the Lifetime Movie Network's 11-year history at that time.

=== Reception ===
Although the movie set ratings records for Lifetime, the movie was not received well by critic Alec Harvey of The Birmingham News. Harvey called the movie "sloppy and uneven, a forgettable look at the tragedy that consumed the nation's attention for months". Conversely, Jake Meaney of PopMatters found the film to be surprisingly "calm and levelheaded", and specifically praised Tracy Pollan's portrayal of Beth Holloway. Holloway said that she was honored by Pollan's portrayal and that there "could not have been a better choice."

Joran van der Sloot himself watched the film one evening in 2010, according to his friend John Ludwick, and said that some parts were true while others were not.

== Home media ==
The film was released on DVD for home video on November 10, 2009 by Sony Pictures. It was released internationally on DVD in January 2010 in the Netherlands, Germany, and Argentina. It has also been released in France, Greece, and Spain.

== Sequel ==
A follow-up television film, Justice for Natalee Holloway, with Pollan, Show, and Gumerick reprising their roles from the first film and Stephen Amell taking the part of Joran van der Sloot, aired on May 9, 2011 on the Lifetime Movie Network. The sequel film takes place five years after the 2005 disappearance of Natalee Holloway, as Beth Twitty partners with the FBI in trying to bring Joran van der Sloot to justice.
