= Larry Garrison =

American writer

Larry Garrison is President of SilverCreek Entertainment in Los Angeles. He is an executive producer in film and television, a journalist, an author, an actor, and a publicist who works with magazine shows, print and radio. His company has produced and brokered news stories for ABC News, NBC News and other news media organizations.

== Books ==
His books include The New York Times best seller Aruba: The Tragic Untold Story of Natalee Holloway and Corruption in Paradise, his memoir The NewsBreaker, and Breaking Into Acting for Dummies. Son of A Grifter: The Twisted Tale of Sante and Kenny Kimes, the Most Notorious Con Artists in America, won an Edgar Award for best Fact Crime book in 2002.
