= Grupo Anderson's =

Restaurant chain in Mexico

Grupo Anderson’s S.A. de C.V. was founded by Carlos Anderson in 1963.

Based in Cancún, Grupo Anderson’s has developed several restaurant concepts, including Carlos'n Charlie's, Señor Frog's, Carlos O'Brian's and El Squid Roe. Other brands include El Tumbaburros, El Shrimp Bucket, Mama Roma, Come ‘n Eat and So Good, Harry's, Porfirio's and Fred's House.

The company has restaurants in Mexico, South America, the Caribbean, Spain and most recently, in the United States. In 2005, Grupo Anderson’s made its debut in the U.S. with the opening of a Señor Frog’s location in Myrtle Beach, South Carolina. The U.S. locations are in Myrtle Beach (2005), Hawaii, Las Vegas, and Orlando (January 2012). A further branch opened in Miami Beach on 24 April 2015.
