= Patrick van der Eem =

Dutch drug dealer

- Born: Patrick Paul van der Eem; 1973 (age 52–53); Curaçao, Netherlands Antilles
- Occupations: Drug dealer, writer
- Known for: Peter R. de Vries undercover video
- Parent: Leon van der Eem

Patrick Paul van der Eem (born 1973 in Curaçao) is a Dutch Antillean and convicted drug dealer known for his part in the undercover television report about Joran van der Sloot that was produced by Dutch crime reporter Peter R. de Vries. The program set a Dutch television viewing record and renewed attention in the ongoing investigation of the 2005 disappearance of American student Natalee Holloway in Aruba.

== Background ==
Patrick van der Eem is the son of Leon van der Eem, a former operator of nine McDonald's franchises. The younger van der Eem was convicted twice on drug charges and has been blocked from entering the United States because of his criminal record. According to van der Eem in 2008, he had only received traffic tickets since his last drug offense in 1995. In 2003, van der Eem opened a Pirtek franchise which repairs hydraulic hoses. A company spokesperson stated that van der Eem's 7-person organization is the best operated in the Benelux region.

Van der Eem has a visible scar on his left cheek which he says is a "boca grande" inflicted on him by criminals in retaliation for being an informant. However, he had told his CEO Martin Melkert that the scar was the result of a car accident.

== Joran van der Sloot undercover video ==
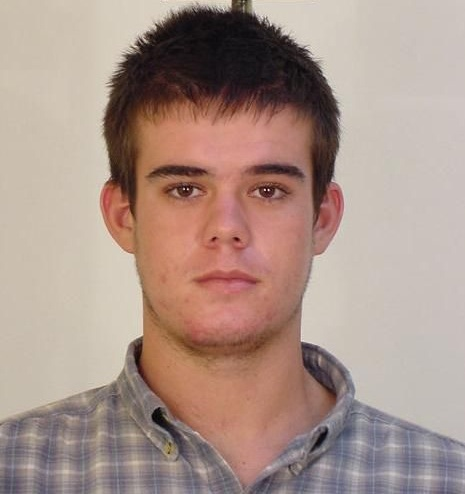
Police photo of Joran van der Sloot

On February 3, 2008, SBS6 aired a program produced by de Vries in which one time Dutch suspect Joran van der Sloot discusses his knowledge of the Natalee Holloway case with van der Eem while riding in a car which contained hidden cameras. Van der Sloot is seen in the tape smoking marijuana. Van der Eem later said that he regularly used cocaine in front of van der Sloot over a seven-month period to retain his trust. The broadcast was watched by 7 million viewers in the Netherlands and was the most popular non-sports program in Dutch television history. Van der Eem was paid €25,000 for his work on the undercover report.

In an exclusive interview with ABC News, van der Eem said that he first met van der Sloot in a Dutch casino in Nijmegen. Without introduction, he said, "Hey murderer!" in Papiamento, the language of Aruba, to gain van der Sloot's attention. Van der Eem said that he was "totally convinced Joran is telling the truth" in the recordings. Van der Eem said that ABC paid US$830,000 to secure the rights to broadcast the program in the United States.

Aruban prosecutor Hans Mos said that he took the "very impressive" taped account "very seriously" and that he would reopen the investigation. However, the evidence was deemed insufficient to warrant re-arrest. Although the taped confession appeared damning, van der Sloot argued that he was lying to impress van der Eem, who he believed to be a drug dealer.

When you can do something which others can't, the FBI, the CIA, the police... Everyone was looking and Patrick finds. Then you feel yourself to be a tough guy.

— Patrick van der Eem

== Media coverage of van der Eem ==
Early in March 2008, van der Eem himself was secretly taped after giving an interview for the Aruban television program Un Dia den Bida (One Day in Life) with John Anthony "Poentje" Castro. Van der Eem continued talking candidly, under the assumption that cameras had been turned off. Van der Eem disclosed that he had been a friend of van der Sloot for years, contradicting his statement on the de Vries program that he had just met van der Sloot in 2007. Van der Eem said that he expected to become a millionaire from his involvement in the Holloway case. He said that he knew the person who supposedly disposed of Holloway's body and that van der Sloot had asked him for two thousand euros to buy the man's silence. According to Dutch news service Algemeen Nederlands Persbureau, van der Eem, who had signed a book deal, "was furious" after learning of the taping and "threatened" the interviewer, who sought legal advice. Castro was requested by the Aruban Justice Department to refrain from broadcasting any material that could compromise the Holloway case. Castro himself was assassinated in front of his own home in December 2010. The police have had no success in linking this cold case to van der Eem.

In December 2008, van der Eem was arrested in Arnhem, Netherlands for attacking his girlfriend with a crowbar and driving erratically while evading police. He claimed to be under the influence of drugs at the time and was sentenced to 30 hours of community service.

== Book ==
Overboord: hoe ik Joran van der Sloot aan het praten kreeg
- Author: Patrick van der Eem; Elizabeth E. Byars
- Language: Dutch
- Genre: Autobiography, true crime
- Publisher: TM (FMB uitgevers)
- Publication date: June 25, 2008
- Publication place: Netherlands
- Pages: 320
- ISBN: 978-90-499-0079-3
- OCLC: 233591424

Van der Eem collaborated with author Elizabeth E. Byars to write Overboord: hoe ik Joran van der Sloot aan het praten kreeg (Overboard: how I got Joran van der Sloot to talk), an autobiographical non-fiction book that was first published in Dutch on June 25, 2008, by TM, an imprint of FMB uitgevers. The book became a best seller in the Netherlands and was later published in English as an eBook under the title Disposed: One Man's Journey to Uncover the Truth. De Vries wrote the introduction to the book in which Van der Eem covers his past as a drug addict and dealer and recounts his experience with van der Sloot with transcripts of the undercover video.

Joran is telling the truth about what happened to Natalee... she died in his arms on the beach that night.

— Patrick van der Eem

== Trivia ==
In December 2008, van der Eem was briefly arrested after being reported for the abuse of his girlfriend with a crowbar. In August 2009, he was arrested in Aruba for failing to pay his Radisson Hotel bill and threatening the personnel. It was alleged that he had also failed to pay his bill in three other hotels. It was also reported he was in possession of cocaine.

In June 2011, van der Eem was arrested during a traffic police check on the A12 highway in the Netherlands.

In the 2009 American television show ‘Homeland Security USA’ S01E05, van der Eem is featured where he is refused entry into the US because of his criminal past.

== 2013 Sentencing ==
On May 3, 2013, van der Eem was sentenced by the Arnhem District Court to serve twelve months in prison. The reason for his punishment was his co-perpetration in a ram-raiding in Oosterbeek stealing ski clothing with a value of approximately €30,000 as well as handling stolen goods by using a stolen Volkswagen Caddy for a covert transport of the clothes.

== See also ==
- Aruba: The Tragic Untold Story of Natalee Holloway and Corruption in Paradise by Dave Holloway
- De zaak Natalee Holloway by Joran van der Sloot
- Loving Natalee: A Mother's Testament of Hope and Faith by Beth Holloway
