= Señor Frog's =

Mexican restaurant chain

Senor Frog's
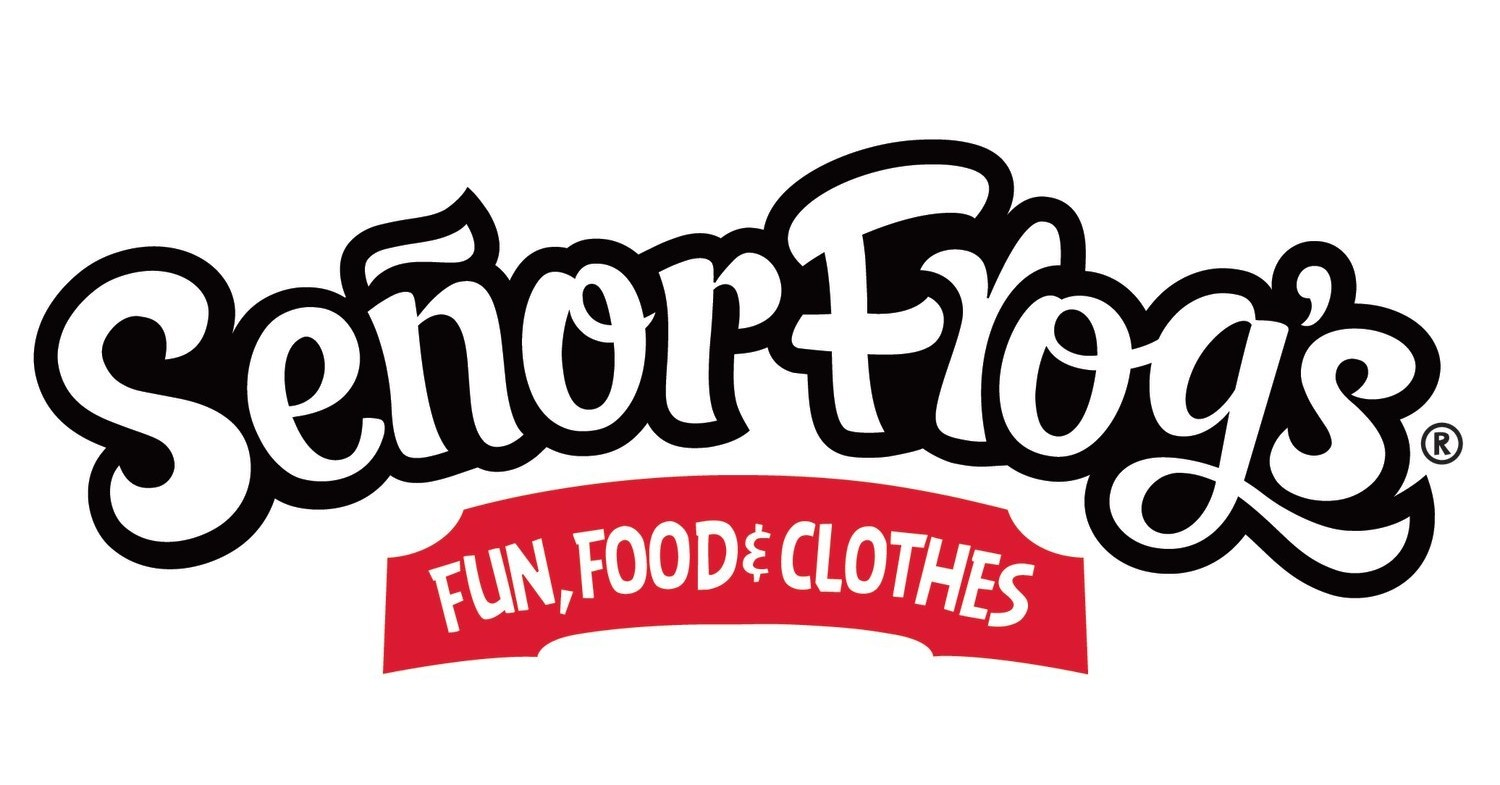
- Type: Mexican restaurants
- Industry: Quick service restaurants
- Genre: Fast Casual
- Founded: 1971; 55 years ago
- Headquarters: Cancún, Quintana Roo, Mexico
- Number of locations: 21 company-owned restaurants
- Area served: Mexico, United States, Caribbean
- Products: Mexican food
- Services: Catering
- Operating income: NET Sales of 110,000,000 USD in 2018
- Owner: Grupo Anderson's
- Parent: Grupo Anderson's
- Website: www.senorfrog's.com

Señor Frog's (Mister Frog) is a Mexican-themed franchised bar and grill in tourist destinations throughout Mexico, the Caribbean, Tenerife, and the United States.

In Mexico and the western Caribbean, about 75% of its revenues come from alcoholic beverage sales. In Myrtle Beach, South Carolina, however, the company has been unable to promote drinking as successfully; food outsells liquor there by a slight margin.

The parent company, Grupo Anderson's, is headquartered in Cancún, Mexico.

== History ==
Señor Frog’s was founded in Mazatlán, Sinaloa, in 1971 by Jesús Humberto "Chuy" Juárez and Carlos Anderson, following the opening of their first restaurant, El Shrimp Bucket, in 1963. The initial Señor Frog's location operated within the Sands Arenas Hotel. The restaurant originally served set meals at communal tables before expanding its concept to include a full menu and alcoholic beverages, alongside traditional seating and a bar area.

Señor Frog's is owned by Grupo Anderson's, founded in 1963, who claims there are more than 50 restaurants making it Mexico's largest restaurateur. In addition to Señor Frog's, Grupo Anderson's owns the Carlos'n Charlie's chain.

During its early years, the founders introduced modular sound equipment to the restaurant, playing imported vinyl records purchased in the United States. Integrating loud, discotheque-style audio experience and an interactive atmosphere into a casual dining space was a departure from traditional Mexican restaurant formats of the 1970s. During this period, the restaurant's menu also expanded to include barbecue ribs and seafood dishes, such as fish, shrimp, and baked oysters.

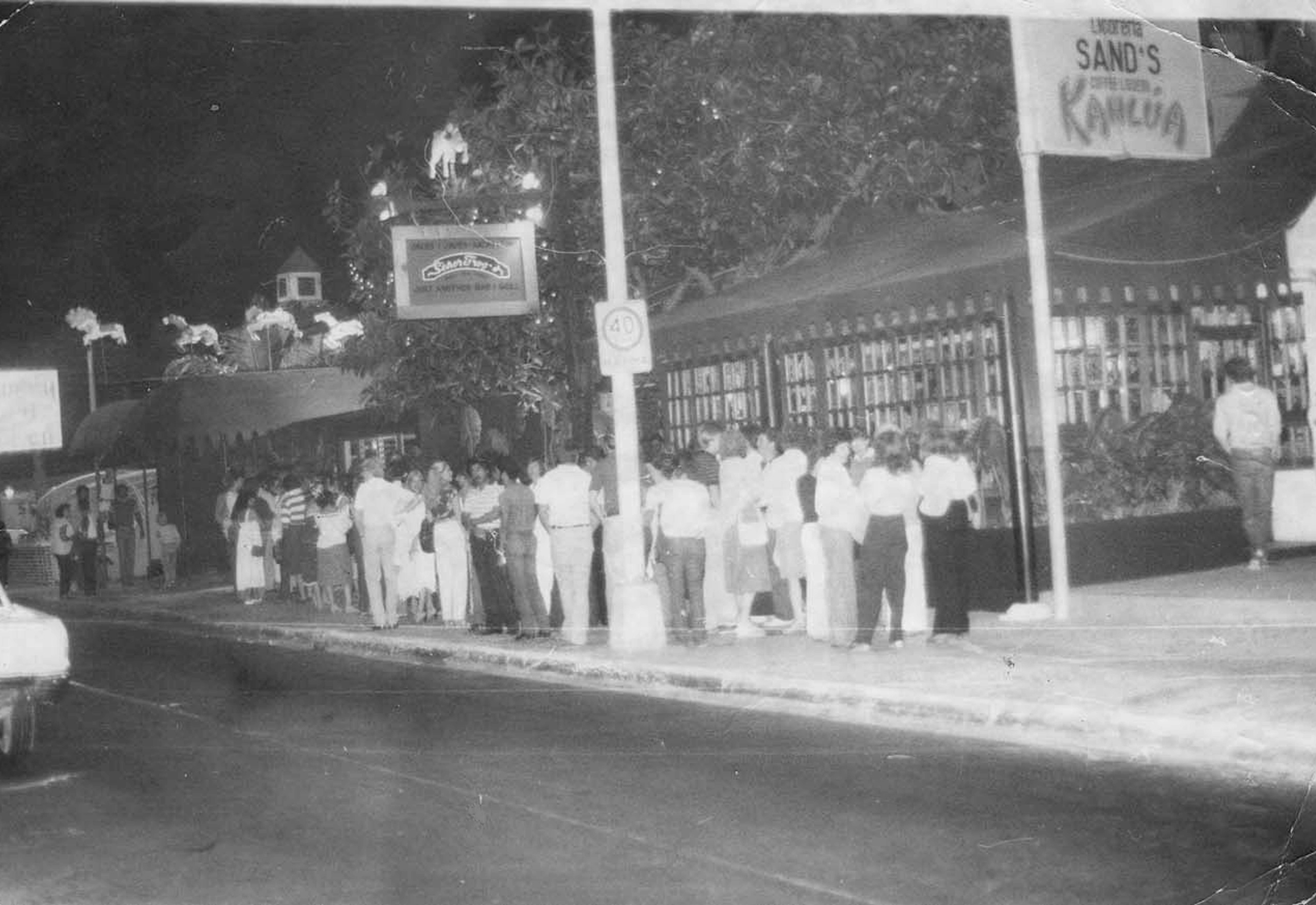
First Señor Frog's Restaurant opened established 1971 in Mazatlan, Mexico

In 1984, the restaurant relocated to a larger building on Mazatlán’s malecón. The new space, formerly a private mansion, was modified to include open areas for dancing. Following the establishment of the Mazatlán location, the founders expanded the brand to other Mexican tourist destinations, including Puerto Vallarta, Cabo San Lucas, and Cancún, operating under various names including Carlos’n Charlie’s, Carlos O’Brians, and El Squid Roe.

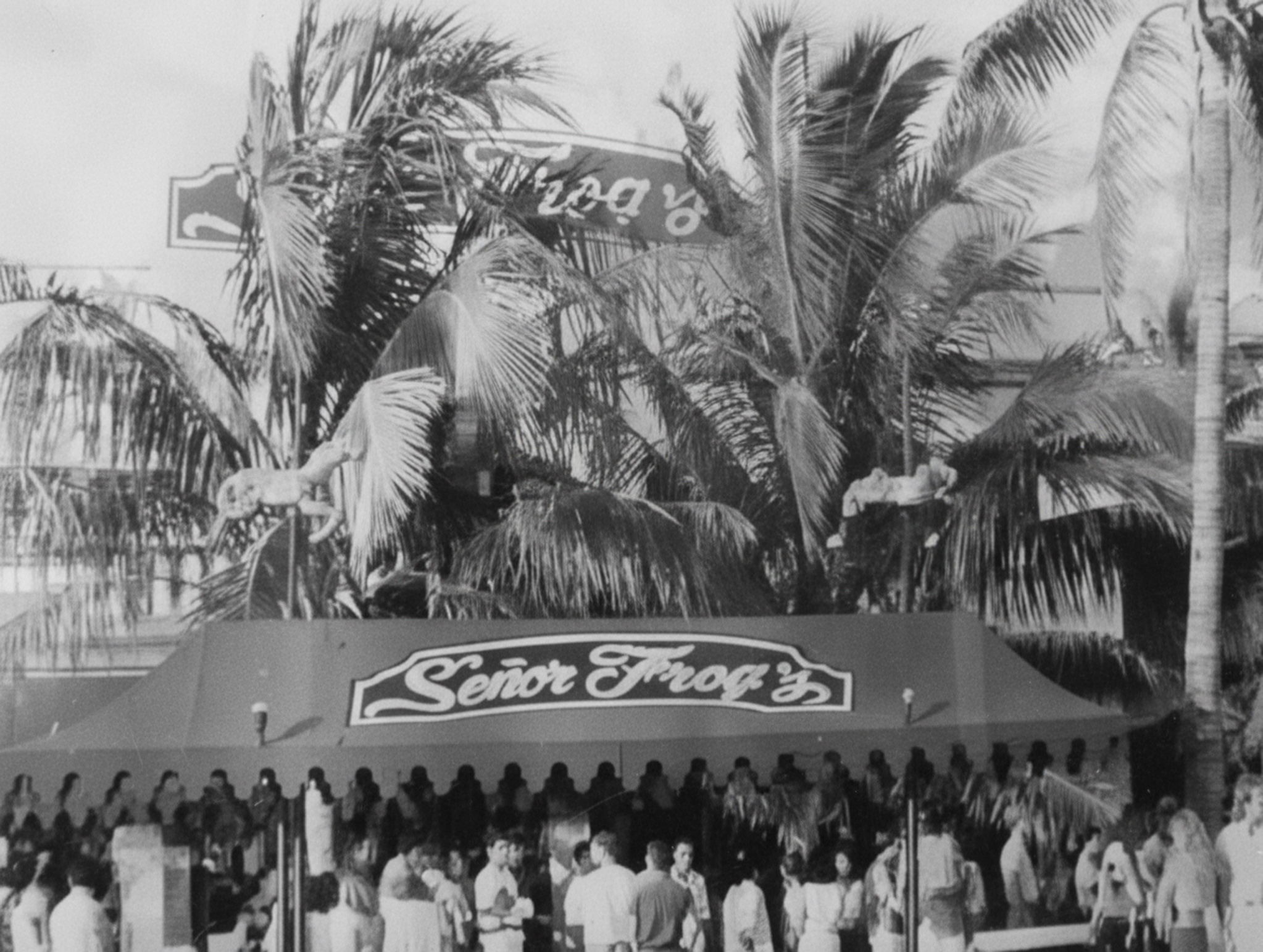
Relocated Señor Frog’s in Mazatlán, Mexico, photographed after its mid‑1980s move.

In 1989, a Señor Frog's location opened over a lagoon in Cancún, which incorporated a stage and live entertainment hosted by English-speaking staff. Throughout the 1990s, the brand opened additional locations in Tijuana and Monterrey.

Today, Señor Frog’s operates as an international restaurant and retail brand, with casual dining locations across Mexico, the Caribbean and the United States.

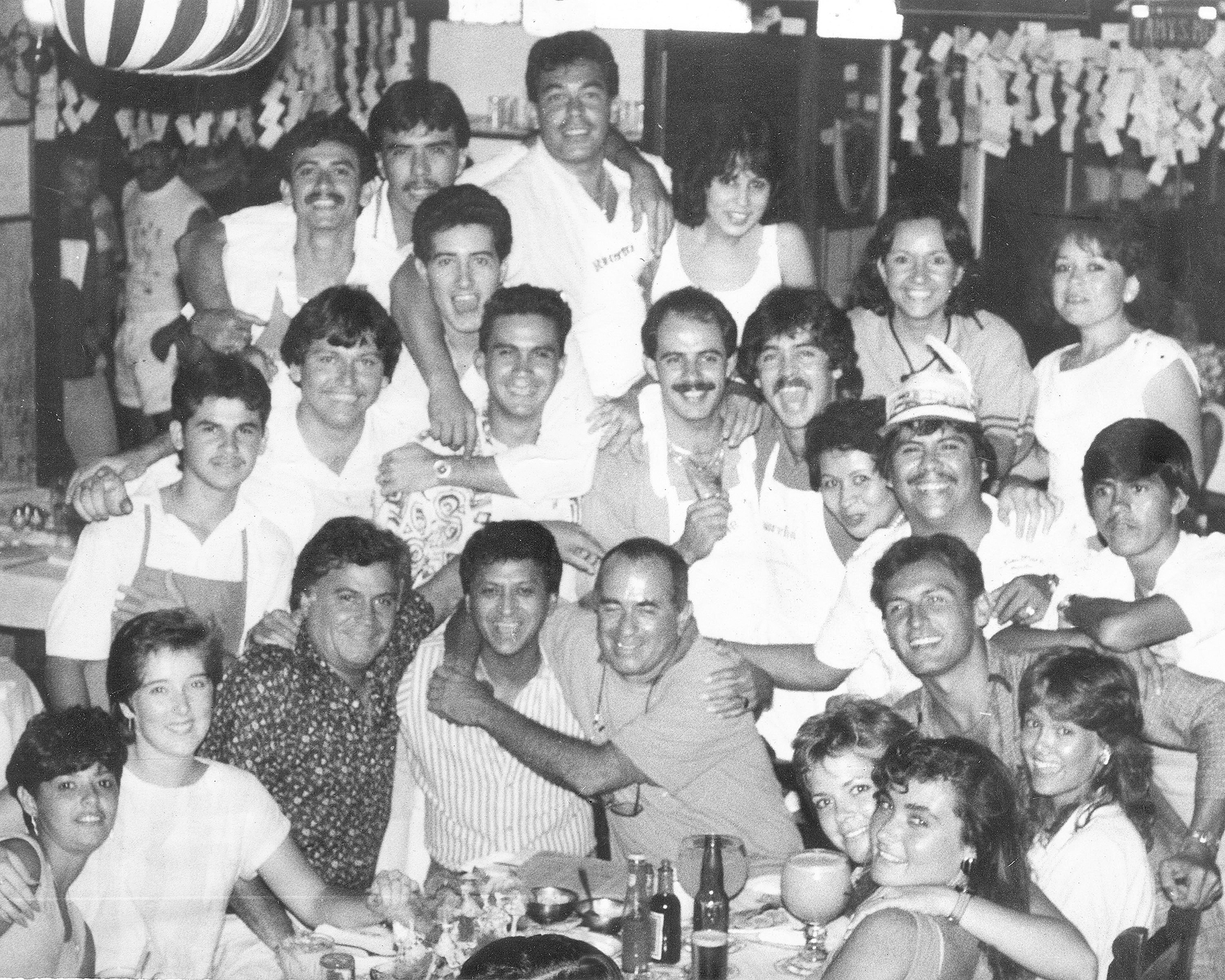
Chuy & Javier Juarez with Carlos Anderson at Señor Frog's Mazatlan (circa 1986)

== Locations ==
There are currently Señor Frogs locations in

- Fort Lauderdale, Florida
- Hollywood, Florida
- Panama City Beach, Florida
- Cabo San Lucas, Baja California Sur, Mexico
- Cancún, Quintana Roo, Mexico
- Cozumel, Quintana Roo, Mexico
- Freeport, The Bahamas
- Nassau, The Bahamas
- Myrtle Beach, South Carolina
- Orlando, Florida
- Playa del Carmen, Quintana Roo, Mexico
- Puerto Vallarta, Jalisco, Mexico
- Isla Mujeres, Quintana Roo, Mexico
