= Joran van der Sloot =

Dutch murderer (born 1987)

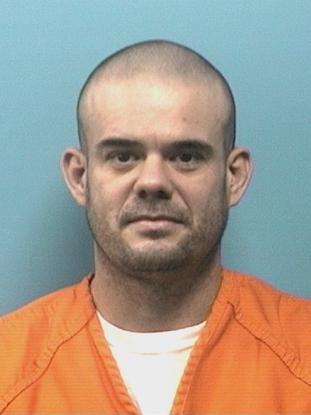
- Shelby County Jail 2023 mug shot of Van der Sloot
- Born: Joran Andreas Petrus van der Sloot; 6 August 1987 (age 39); Arnhem, Netherlands
- Other name: Murphy Jenkins
- Spouse: Leidy Figueroa (m. 2014)
- Children: 1
- Status: Incarcerated at Establecimiento Penitenciario Ancón I
- Convictions: Qualified murder, simple robbery, drug trafficking (Peru); extortion, wire fraud (United States)
- Penalty: 35-years imprisonment (Peru) (Note: 28 years for the killing of Stephany Flores Ramírez; 18 years for trafficking cocaine while in prison; reduced to 35 by Peruvian law) 20 years imprisonment (United States)

Joran Andreas Petrus van der Sloot (Dutch pronunciation: [ˈjoːrɑɱ vɑn dər ˈsloːt]; born 6 August 1987) is a Dutch murderer, extortionist, con man, and drug trafficker who was convicted in the 2010 killing of Stephany Flores Ramírez in Lima, Peru. He first came to public attention as the prime suspect in the disappearance of Natalee Holloway in 2005.

After Flores' murder on 30 May 2010, five years to the day after Holloway's disappearance, Van der Sloot fled to Chile, where he was arrested and extradited to Peru for questioning regarding the murder.

On 7 June 2010, Van der Sloot confessed to bludgeoning Flores. He later tried to formally retract his confession, claiming that he had been intimidated by the Peruvian Police and framed by the FBI. A Peruvian judge ruled on 25 June 2010 that the confession was valid, and on 13 January 2012, Van der Sloot was sentenced to 28 years' imprisonment for Flores's murder. In January 2023, an additional 18 years were added to his sentence for trafficking cocaine while in prison.

On 8 June 2023, Van der Sloot was extradited to the United States to face trial for extortion and wire fraud, charges linked to Holloway's disappearance. On 18 October 2023, he admitted to having killed Holloway in a proffer letter, which was released after he plead guilty to other associated charges in the United States District Court for the Northern District of Alabama.

The Holloway and Flores cases both attracted widespread media attention; Time magazine declared Van der Sloot's arrest the top crime story of 2010. He was the subject of international news coverage from prison, leading to controversies that resulted in the investigation and suspension of several Peruvian officials.

== Background ==
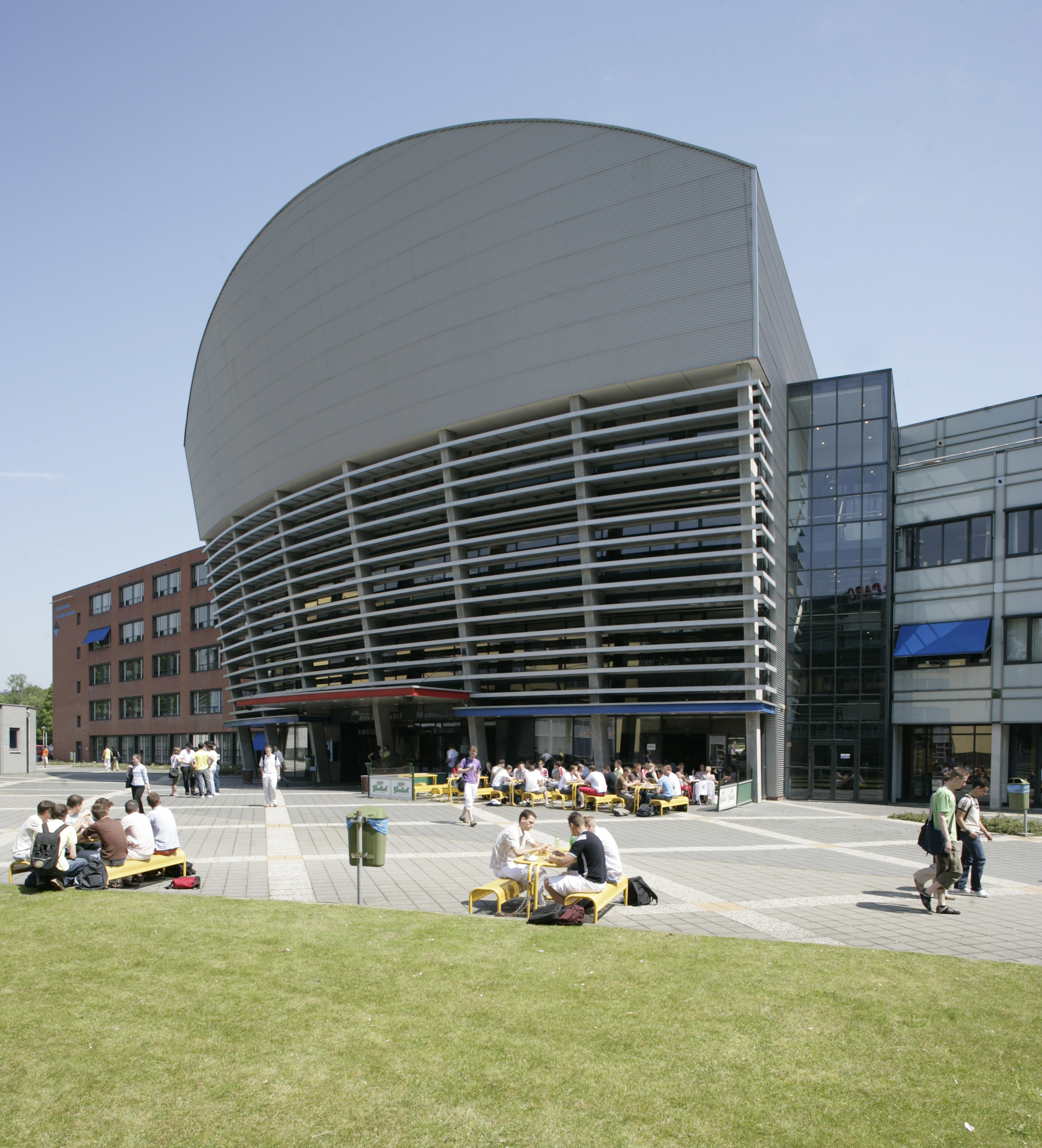
Van der Sloot attended the HAN University of Applied Sciences in the Netherlands.

Joran Andreas Petrus van der Sloot was born on 6 August 1987 in the Dutch city of Arnhem, one of three sons to Paulus van der Sloot (1952–2010), a lawyer, and Anita van der Sloot-Hugen, an art teacher. In 1990, his family moved from Arnhem to Aruba, where he was an honor student at the International School of Aruba.

Van der Sloot was a football (soccer) and tennis athlete at the school, competed in doubles tennis with his father at the Moët & Chandon Anniversary Cup in 2005 and hoped to play for Saint Leo University. Van der Sloot's mother said he was a habitual liar and had a tendency to sneak out of the house at night to go to casinos.

== Disappearance of Natalee Holloway ==
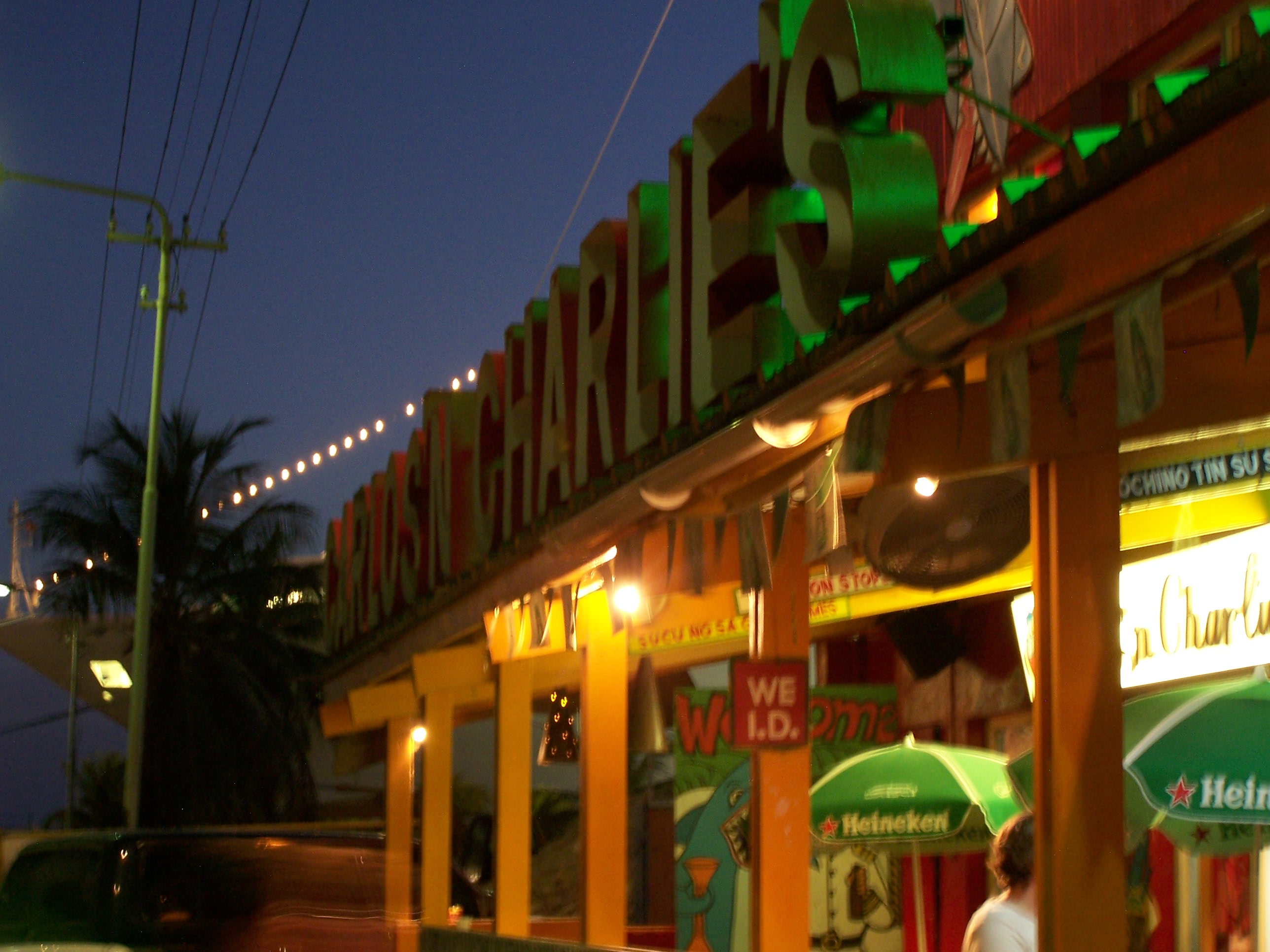
Carlos'n Charlie's in Oranjestad, Aruba, where Natalee Holloway was last seen with Van der Sloot

On 29 May 2005, Van der Sloot met Natalee Holloway at Carlos'n Charlie's bar in downtown Oranjestad, Aruba. Holloway was an 18-year-old American, vacationing in Aruba to celebrate her graduation from high school. Holloway and Van der Sloot drank and danced together at the bar. When the bar closed at 1:00 a.m., Holloway was last seen leaving in a car with Van der Sloot and two brothers, 21-year-old Deepak and 18-year-old Satish Kalpoe.

On 9 June 2005, Van der Sloot and both Kalpoe brothers were arrested in regards to the disappearance of Holloway. The Kalpoe brothers were released from custody on 4 July, while Van der Sloot remained in custody. The brothers were re-arrested on 26 August on suspicion of rape and murder. All three suspects were released on 3 September due to lack of evidence.

After his release, Van der Sloot was required to stay within Dutch territory pending the results of the investigation. On 5 September 2005, he returned to the Netherlands to study international business management at the HAN University of Applied Sciences. On 14 September, a higher court removed the travel restrictions. Gerold G. Dompig, former deputy commissioner of the Aruba Police Force, stated that the initial arrests were made prematurely under pressure from Holloway's family. Dompig charged that the family sidetracked the investigation by making it difficult for the police to collect evidence to solve the case.

=== Media coverage ===
On 26 September 2005, Van der Sloot told the American television show A Current Affair that neither he nor the Kalpoe brothers had sex with Holloway, but he admitted that they initially agreed to lie to the authorities. He said that they first told police that Holloway was dropped off alone at her hotel, while he later said that he was dropped off with her at the beach. Van der Sloot stated that he left Holloway alone at the beach at her request and that he regretted it.

On 6 February 2006, on ABC's Good Morning America, Van der Sloot's parents stated that their son was unfairly singled out and that the investigation left them devastated. Later that month, while Van der Sloot and his father were in New York City for an interview with ABC's Primetime, they were served with a lawsuit filed by Natalee's parents, Beth and Dave Holloway, alleging personal injury; the case was dismissed on jurisdictional grounds that August.

In April 2007 Van der Sloot and a reporter published a book describing the case. Van der Sloot began writing the book while attending business classes in Arnhem. He stated in the introduction, "I see this book as my opportunity to be open and honest about everything that happened, for anyone who wants to read it."

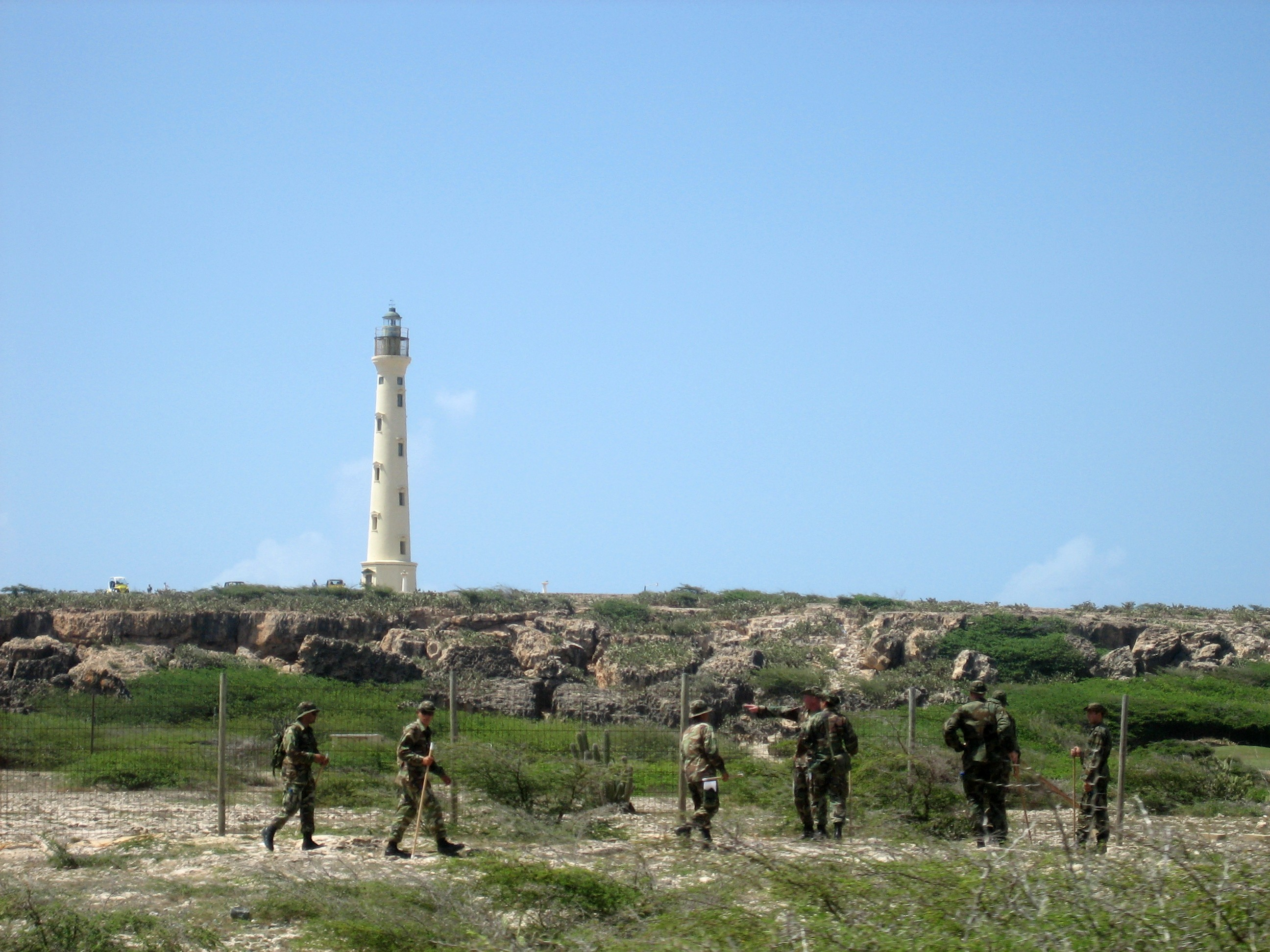
Dutch Marines searching for Holloway near Aruba's California Lighthouse

=== 2007 search and arrest ===
On 27 April 2007, a new search involving some 20 investigators was launched at Van der Sloot's parents' home in Aruba. Dutch authorities searched the yard and surrounding area, using shovels and thin metal rods to probe the ground. A spokesman for the prosecutor's office, Vivian van der Biezen, stated: "The investigation has never stopped and the Dutch authorities are completely reviewing the case for new indications." A statement released directly from the prosecutor's office stated: "The team has indications that justify a more thorough search." Investigators did not comment on what prompted the new search, except that it was not related to Van der Sloot's book.

On 21 November 2007, Van der Sloot and the Kalpoe brothers were re-arrested in Arnhem and Aruba, respectively, for "suspicion of involvement in voluntary manslaughter and causing serious bodily harm that resulted in the death of Natalee Holloway" because of what the Aruba prosecutor's office stated was "new incriminating evidence" related to Holloway's disappearance. Van der Sloot returned to Aruba on 23 November, and a court hearing on 26 November ruled to continue his detention for eight days. The Kalpoe brothers were released on 1 December. Van der Sloot was ordered released on 7 December; he was released without charge the same day.

=== 2008 Dutch television sting operations ===
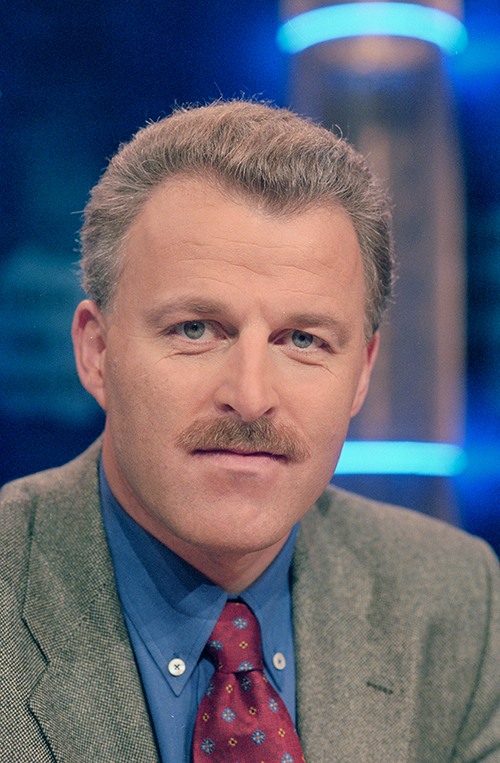
Dutch journalist Peter R. de Vries pursued Van der Sloot via undercover reports.

On 11 January 2008, after being challenged on the Dutch late-night talk show Pauw & Witteman by crime reporter Peter de Vries, Van der Sloot threw a glass of red wine in De Vries's face. On 3 February, an undercover video made by De Vries aired on Dutch television, purporting to show Van der Sloot smoking marijuana and admitting to being present during Holloway's death. The show was watched by 7 million viewers in the Netherlands and was the most popular non-sports program in Dutch television history.

Patrick van der Eem, working undercover for De Vries, had befriended Van der Sloot, who was unaware that he was being taped when he said that Holloway had suffered some kind of seizure while having sex with him on the beach. After failing to revive her, Van der Sloot said that he summoned a friend named "Daury". The two men neither phoned for medical help nor checked Holloway to determine if she might still be alive. "Daury", according to Van der Sloot, volunteered to load her onto a boat; he then dumped Holloway's body into the sea. The prosecutor in Aruba determined the video was admissible, but the evidence was deemed "insufficient" to warrant any arrests. Although the taped confession appeared damning, Van der Sloot maintained that he had been lying to Van der Eem in order to impress him, believing his new acquaintance to be a drug dealer.

On 22 September 2008, in New York City, De Vries, accompanied by Beth Holloway, accepted an International Emmy Award in Current Affairs for his coverage of Natalee Holloway's disappearance. Under pressure generated by the Pauw & Witteman program, Van der Sloot voluntarily checked into a psychiatric clinic, before departing the Netherlands for Thailand. He moved to Muang Ake, a suburb of Bangkok, intending to study business at Rangsit University, but dropped out and bought Sawadee Cup, a restaurant next to the campus that served sandwiches and pizza.

In November 2008, De Vries aired undercover footage of Van der Sloot making preparations for the apparent sex trafficking of Thai women in Bangkok into Europe. De Vries claimed that Van der Sloot was making $13,000 for every woman sold into prostitution in the Netherlands. Van der Sloot had been using the alias "Murphy Jenkins" in order to avoid Thai authorities. Peruvian Minister of Justice Aurelio Pastor later was to state that Thailand was pursuing criminal charges against Van der Sloot. According to National Enquirer, he was being investigated by Thai authorities for his involvement in the disappearance of young women he may have recruited for a Thai sex slave gang while posing as a production consultant for a modeling agency that, ostensibly, would send them to Europe to work as models.

Van der Sloot was portrayed by actor Jacques Strydom in the Lifetime television film Natalee Holloway (2009), based on Beth Holloway's book about her daughter's disappearance. The film brought in the highest television ratings in Lifetime's then-eleven-year history. Van der Sloot himself watched the film one evening in 2010, according to his friend, John Ludwick, and said that some parts were true while others were not. The film was followed by a sequel, Justice for Natalee Holloway (2011), in which Van der Sloot was played by actor Stephen Amell.

In August 2009, Van der Sloot was spotted in Macau at the Asia Pacific Poker Tour. He won over $12,000 that year in an online poker tournament. Van der Sloot described himself on his YouTube page as "a professional poker player" and cited Barry Greenstein's 2005 poker strategy guide as his favorite book.

In early 2010, following the death of his father, Paulus, he sold his Bangkok restaurant business and returned to Aruba.

=== Father's involvement in the case ===
Paulus van der Sloot was arrested on 22 June 2005, for questioning in Holloway's disappearance. He was ordered released on 26 June after three days of questioning. According to Aruba's chief prosecutor, one of the Kalpoe brothers told investigators that Paulus, who at the time was training to be a judge, advised his son that, without a body, the police would have no case. Beth Holloway pursued Van der Sloot's parents in the media circus on Aruba which ensued after Natalee's disappearance. She stated that Paulus acknowledged that they could not control their son and had sent him to a psychiatrist.

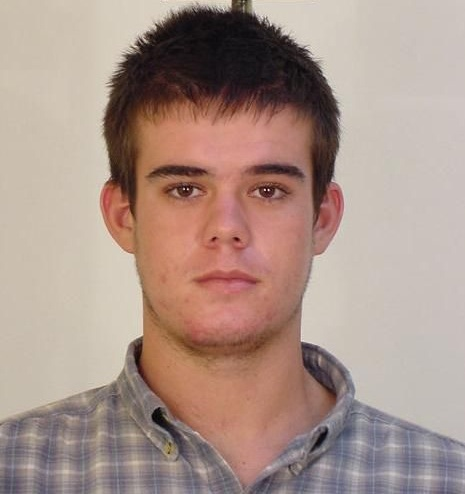
Van der Sloot in 2005

On 10 November 2005, Paulus won an unjust detention action against the Aruban government, clearing him as a suspect and allowing him to retain his government contract. Paulus van der Sloot then brought a second action, seeking monetary damages for himself and his family because of his false arrest. The action was initially successful, but the award of 40,000 Aruban florins (US$22,300) was reversed on appeal. The family's finances had become depleted by their legal expenses. In January 2007, Paulus found work as a managing partner at the law firm that had represented him.

On 24 November 2008, Fox News's On the Record aired an interview with Joran van der Sloot in which he said that he sold Holloway into sexual slavery, receiving money both when Holloway was taken and, later, to keep quiet. He also alleged that he paid the Kalpoe brothers for their assistance, and that his father Paulus paid off two police officers who had learned that Holloway was taken to Venezuela. Van der Sloot later retracted the statements he had made in the interview. The show aired part of an audio recording provided by Van der Sloot, which he alleged was a phone conversation between himself and Paulus, in which Paulus displayed knowledge of his son's purported involvement in human trafficking. According to prosecutor Hans Mos, the other voice heard on the recording was not that of Paulus. The Dutch newspaper De Telegraaf reported that the "father's" voice was almost certainly that of Joran himself, trying to speak in a lower tone.

On 8 January 2010, Paulus ended his partnership at the law firm where he had been working. On 10 February 2010, while playing tennis in Aruba, he died of a heart attack at age 57. Joran van der Sloot returned to Aruba soon afterward and took up gambling. His mother, Anita, later remarked that Van der Sloot had severe mental problems and had blamed himself for his father's death. He had left for Peru before she could have him involuntarily committed, leaving a note: "I'm gone, do not worry."

=== 2010 charges in the United States ===
Around 29 March 2010, Van der Sloot contacted John Q. Kelly, Beth Holloway's legal representative, with an offer to reveal the location of Natalee's body and the circumstances surrounding her death for an advance of $25,000 against a total of $250,000. Kelly said that he secretly went to Aruba in April to meet with Van der Sloot, who was desperate for money, and gave him $100. Kelly notified the FBI, which set up a sting operation with the Aruban authorities.

On 10 May, Van der Sloot accepted the sum of $15,000 by wire transfer to his account in the Netherlands, following a cash payment of $10,000 that was videotaped by undercover investigators in Aruba. In exchange, Van der Sloot told Kelly that his father buried Holloway's remains in the foundation of a house. Authorities determined that this information was false, because the house had not yet been built at the time of Holloway's disappearance. Van der Sloot later e‑mailed Kelly that he lied about the house. Beth Holloway was shocked that the FBI did not promptly file extortion charges against Van der Sloot, allowing him to leave freely with the money to Bogotá on his way to Lima. The FBI and the office of the U.S. Attorney contended that the case had not yet been sufficiently developed to enable filing the charges.

On 3 June 2010, the U.S. District Court of Northern Alabama charged Van der Sloot with extortion and wire fraud. U.S. Attorney Joyce White Vance issued an arrest warrant through Interpol to have him prosecuted in the United States. On 4 June, at the request of the U.S. Justice Department, Dutch authorities raided and confiscated items from two homes in the Netherlands, one of them belonging to reporter Jaap Amesz, who had previously interviewed Van der Sloot, and who claimed knowledge of his criminal activities.

Aruban investigators used information gathered from the extortion case to perform a new search at a beach, but no new evidence was found. Aruba's Solicitor-General's office stated they would not seek Van der Sloot's extradition to Aruba. On 30 June, a U.S. federal grand jury formally indicted Van der Sloot on the two charges. The indictment, filed with the U.S. District Court, sought the forfeiture of the $25,100 that had been paid to Van der Sloot.

In an interview published by De Telegraaf on 6 September 2010, Van der Sloot admitted to the extortion plot, stating: "I wanted to get back at Natalee's family. Her parents have been making my life tough for five years." His attorney said that his client was not paid for the interview, and suggested instead that "maybe there were some mistakes in the translation."

On 9 March 2014, the Peruvian government announced that Van der Sloot would face extradition to the U.S. in 2038 to face charges of extortion and wire fraud, after completion of his 28-year sentence in Peru for the murder of Stephany Tatiana Flores Ramírez.

In February 2016, an Undercover reporter filmed Van der Sloot confessing to Natalee Holloway's murder. The video shows Van der Sloot, in Dutch, laughing over how he never told the truth about the whole event and that he did in fact kill Holloway. His Peruvian wife is also present during this conversation.

=== 2023 extradition to the United States, and confession ===
On 8 June 2023, Van der Sloot was extradited from Peru to the United States, landing at Birmingham Airport in Birmingham, Alabama just before 2:30 p.m. After arriving in Birmingham, he was taken into U.S. custody and transferred to the Hoover City Jail. On 9 June, he was arraigned in the federal court in Birmingham on one count of extortion and one count of wire fraud against Beth Holloway, Natalee Holloway's mother. He pleaded not guilty to each charge.

On 18 October 2023, in a proffer letter as part of a plea deal, Van der Sloot admitted to beating Holloway to death on an Aruban beach. According to an interview transcript, Van der Sloot bludgeoned her head with a cinder block and disposed of her body in the ocean. U.S. District Judge Anna M. Manasco sentenced van der Sloot to 20 years on the extortion charges, which will run concurrently with his existing Peruvian sentence.

== Murder of Stephany Flores ==
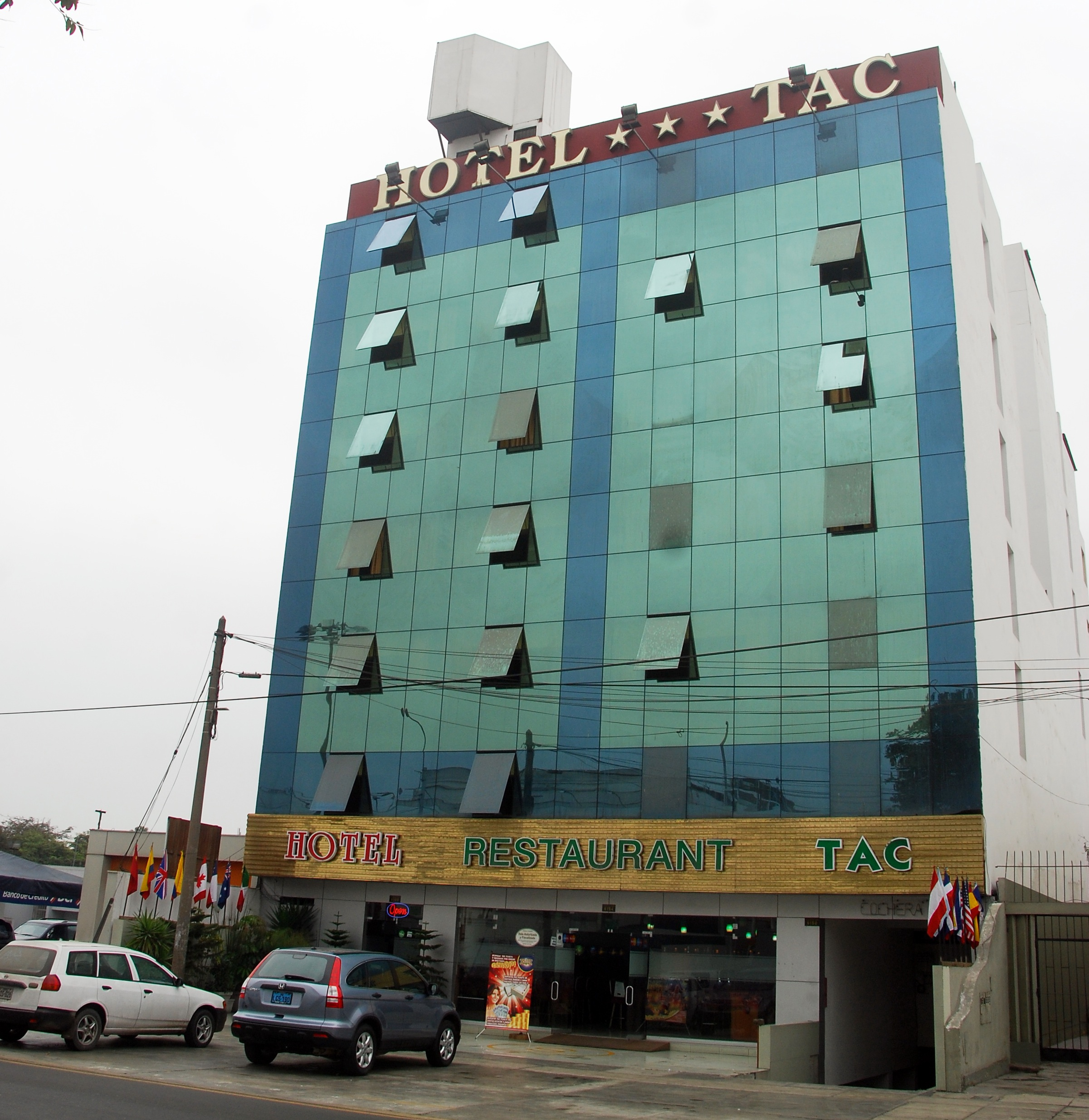
Stephany Tatiana Flores Ramírez was found dead in Van der Sloot's room at Hotel TAC, S.A.C. in Lima.

On 30 May 2010—the fifth anniversary of Holloway's disappearance—Stephany Tatiana Flores Ramírez, 21, died at the Hotel TAC, in the Miraflores District of Lima, Peru. On 2 June, a hotel employee found her beaten body in room 309, which had been registered in Van der Sloot's name. He had departed from the hotel without returning the room key and left the television turned on. A tennis racquet, identified by the coroner as a possible homicide weapon, was recovered from the room.

A hotel guest and an employee came forward to say they saw Van der Sloot and the victim entering the hotel room together, and the police obtained video of the two playing cards at the same table the night before at the Atlantic City Casino in Lima. Van der Sloot had entered Peru via Colombia on 14 May 2010 to attend the Latin American Poker Tour.

Flores was a business student who was less than a year from graduation at the University of Lima. She was the daughter of Ricardo Flores, a former president of the Peruvian Automobile Club and winner of the "Caminos del Inca" rally in 1991. A prominent businessman and entertainment organizer, he ran for vice president in 2001 and for president five years later on fringe tickets.

Ricardo Flores said that police found date rape drugs in his daughter's car, parked about 50 blocks from the hotel where she died. Her jewelry, money, identification, and credit cards were missing, including about $1,000 her father had given her to purchase a laptop computer, and over $10,000 she had won earlier at the casino. Flores reportedly kept this money in her car, but a police search found no money in it.

After Flores's family reported her missing, police retrieved the hotel security surveillance tape and obtained Van der Sloot's name and national identification number. Her brother's wife discovered Van der Sloot's background in a Google search about an hour before her body was found.

=== 2010 arrest ===
Map of Van der Sloot's travel sites in South America

Peruvian officials named Van der Sloot as the lone suspect in the homicide investigation. An Interpol notice was issued regarding Van der Sloot and it was believed that he had fled to Chile, possibly intending to return to Aruba through Argentina. Van der Sloot was sighted entering Chile via the Chacalluta border crossing, north of Arica, on 31 May 2010. His ex-girlfriend, Melody Granadillo, said that Van der Sloot sent her a text message asking for money to buy a ticket back to Aruba.

On 3 June, Van der Sloot was arrested near Curacaví by the Investigations Police of Chile while traveling in a rented taxi on highway 68 between the coastal city of Viña del Mar and the capital of Santiago. He was found with a laptop, foreign currency, a business card case, detailed charts of ocean currents around Lima, and bloody clothes. Police found that his phone's SIM card was missing, which at the time would have made tracking Van der Sloot's location through his phone impossible.

He told Chilean police that unidentified armed robbers hid in the hotel room and killed Flores when she disobeyed their order to be quiet. Van der Sloot's Dutch attorney claimed that his client was on his way to Santiago to turn himself in. He was subsequently expelled and transported by Chilean police in a Cessna 310 back to Arica to be handed over to Peruvian authorities at the Chacalluta border crossing on 4 June.

Van der Sloot arrived at Lima police headquarters on 5 June, where he was interrogated about the Flores murder while represented by attorney Luz Maria Romero Chinchay. The Dutch embassy provided a translator for his defense. He was held in a seventh-floor cell and permitted to contact his mother. Van der Sloot was placed on suicide watch by guards after it was reported that he deliberately hit his head against a wall. On 10 June, he was moved to a cell at the prosecutor's office in central Lima.

=== Forensic investigation ===
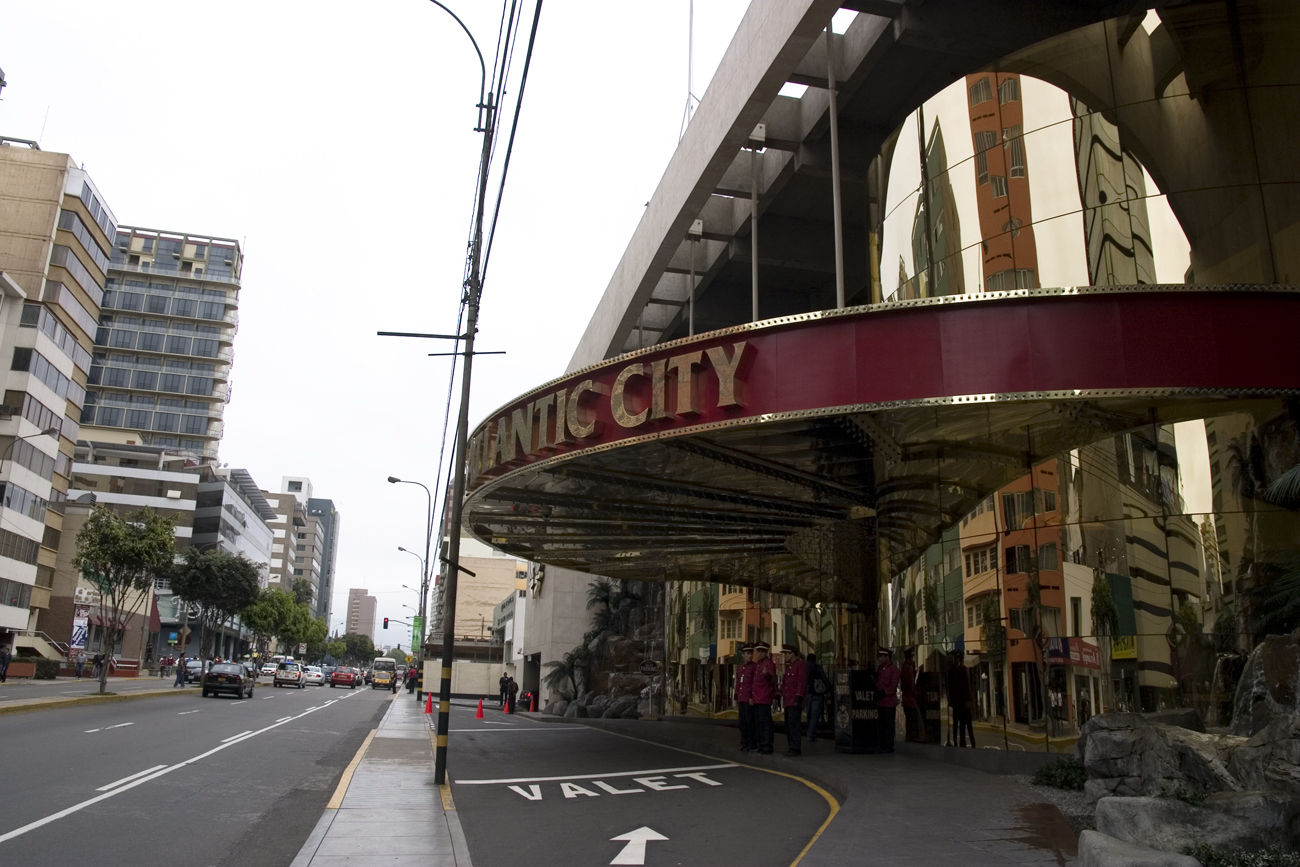
The Atlantic City Casino in Lima, where Van der Sloot and Flores were recorded on surveillance video

Surveillance video from the Atlantic City Casino recorded Flores winning $10,000 at a baccarat table area on 25 May 2010, while accompanied by a male friend who was not van der Sloot. According to casino spokesperson Luis Laos, she also won $237 playing poker on 29 May and it was common for people to know the identities of big winners. Laos stated that van der Sloot did not win any money that night. At 3:00 a.m. on 30 May Flores was recorded entering the casino alone and walking to a poker table where Van der Sloot was sitting. Van der Sloot had not registered for the Latin American Poker Tour. The deadline to pay the $2,700 entry fee for the 2 June event at the casino was 30 May.

Police released hotel security video showing van der Sloot and Flores entering the Hotel TAC together at about 5:00 a.m. on 30 May. At about 8:10 a.m., he is shown walking across the street to a supermarket and returning with bread and two cups of coffee. Around 8:45 a.m., he is seen leaving the hotel alone with his bags.

An autopsy ruled that Flores did not have sexual intercourse before her death, and that she was not under the influence of enough alcohol to prevent her from resisting an attack. She suffered blunt-force trauma to her head, which caused a brain hemorrhage, cranial fracture, and broken neck. She also suffered significant injuries to her face and showed signs of asphyxiation, according to court documents. Flores tested positive for the presence of amphetamines. The lab report does not indicate whether the victim took the drugs willingly or unknowingly.

The stains on van der Sloot's clothes matched Flores's blood type. Blood was also found on the floor, hallway, and mattress in the hotel room. Police stated that DNA tests would be conducted on the clothes, skin found under the victim's fingernails, and the previously recovered tennis racquet. Ricardo Flores stated in interviews that his daughter's body needed to be exhumed to gather the fingernail DNA evidence, and that her body had not been cremated for this reason.

On 14 March 2011, the National Police of Peru provided a copy of the hard disk drive from van der Sloot's laptop computer to the FBI. Colonel Oscar González, of the technical division of the Peruvian police, stated that the U.S. federal investigation was interested in information related to Holloway's disappearance and the alleged extortion of her family. Peruvian detectives determined that the laptop accessed information about the Holloway case before Flores arrived in van der Sloot's hotel room; it was then used to visit two poker Web sites at around the time Flores was present in the room. According to a police dossier, the laptop was later used to search Google for the subjects "Relationship between the Peruvian and Chilean police", "Chilean border pass", "buses in Chile", and "countries that do not extradite in Latin America".

=== Confession and retraction ===
On 8 June 2010, Van der Sloot reportedly confessed to killing Flores, following hours of interrogation. He had initially proclaimed his innocence. According to an expert in Peruvian law, the confession fit a defense strategy of trying to get the charge reduced to manslaughter, which is punishable by six to twenty years in prison, while a conviction for murder could result in up to 35 years' imprisonment. The prosecution was seeking a sentence of 30 years.

Peru does not issue life sentences in standard cases of murder and has abolished capital punishment in all but exceptional circumstances, such as crimes committed under military law. A life sentence can be issued for a murder committed during the commission of a robbery. Peruvian president Alan García Pérez used the case to seek the reinstatement of the death penalty for murder.

In his written confession released by Peruvian police, Van der Sloot recounted that he briefly left the hotel to get some coffee and bread and returned to find Flores using his laptop computer without his permission. A police source stated that she might have found information linking him to the disappearance of Holloway. An altercation allegedly began, and she attempted to escape. According to the aforementioned written confession released by Peruvian authorities, Van der Sloot stated:

I did not want to do it. The girl intruded into my private life ... she didn't have any right. I went to her and I hit her. She was scared, we argued, and she tried to escape. I grabbed her by the neck and hit her.

— From Van der Sloot written confession

Van der Sloot reportedly stated that he was high on marijuana at the time. A detective linked to the case said that Van der Sloot considered getting rid of the body in a suitcase, but decided against it because he would have been stopped at the front desk. He then reportedly drank espresso and took amphetamines to counter fatigue before fleeing the hotel.

Criminal police chief Cesar Guardia said Van der Sloot "let slip that he knew the place" where Holloway's body is buried. Guardia stated that the interrogation was limited to their case in Peru, which he considered "practically closed", and that questions about Holloway's disappearance were avoided. Guardia said that the confession contains lies because Van der Sloot's "toxicological report shows no signs that he had ingested any kind of drug." Felonies committed under the influence of drugs can gain leniency in Peruvian courts.

Guardia said that the motive for the crime was robbery. Van der Sloot reportedly offered a different motive for killing Flores, stating that he "feared that she would go to the police". On 14 June, Peruvian authorities released written transcripts of Van der Sloot's alleged confession. His mother Anita expressed concern that her son's confession might have been coerced. According to Van der Sloot's former attorney, his mother advised him not to make any statements or sign anything, but it was too late.

Van der Sloot later retracted this confession in a prison cell interview with De Telegraaf, claiming that he had been coerced and "tricked" by police with a promise to be transferred to the Netherlands. He stated that at the time he signed the confession documents, he did not understand the content as it was in Spanish. He was quoted: "In my blind panic, I signed everything, but didn't even know what it said." Van der Sloot said that he was lured to Peru and framed by another gambler named Elton Garcia, whom he claimed was working undercover for the FBI.

Van der Sloot's attorney, Maximo Alonso Altez Navarro, stated his intention to resign from the case because representing Van der Sloot "created many problems" for him. He had been threatened and harassed for taking the case, and Van der Sloot's family was unable to afford his legal fees. Navarro stayed on to file a motion to void the confession, on the grounds that his client was not properly represented during his interrogation. On 25 June, Superior Court Judge Wilder Casique Alvizuri rejected the motion, noting that Van der Sloot had been represented by a state-appointed lawyer and provided a translator by the Dutch embassy prior to his confession. Navarro commented that Van der Sloot was as "depressed" as anyone in prison would be.

=== Criminal proceedings ===
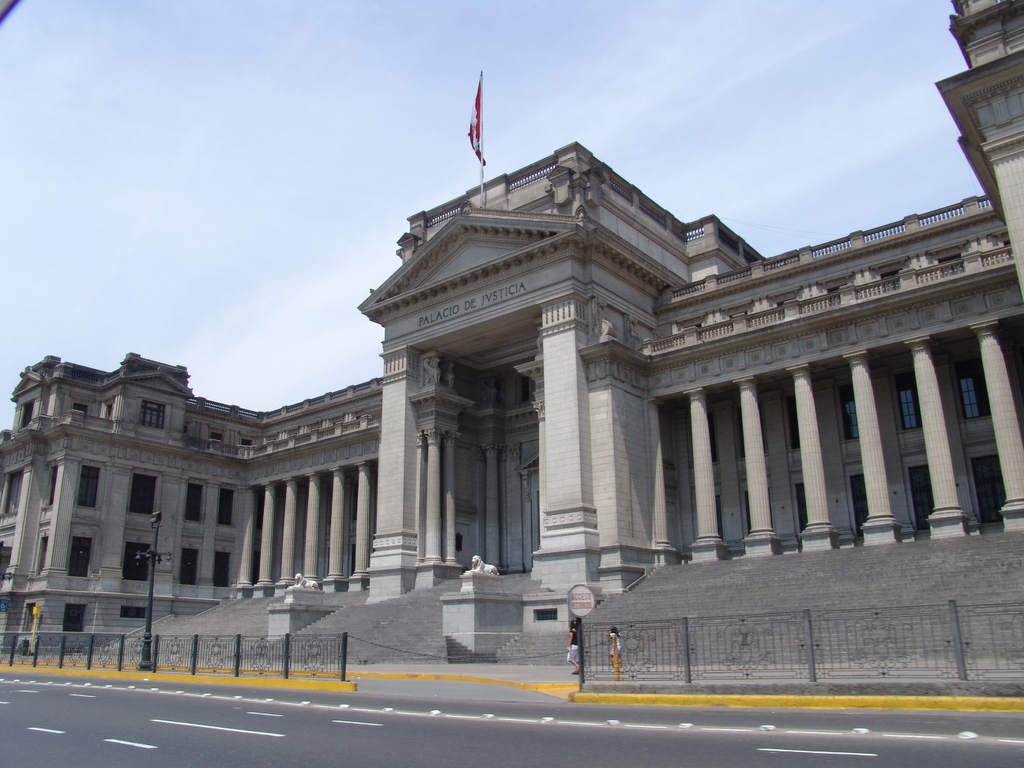
The Palace of Justice in Lima, where Van der Sloot was charged with murder

On 11 June 2010, Lima Superior Court Judge Juan Buendia ordered Van der Sloot held on charges of first-degree murder and robbery, determining that he acted with "ferocity and great cruelty". Under Peruvian law, Van der Sloot was not eligible to be released on bail, and would be tried by a panel of three judges rather than a jury. A simple majority of the three was required for conviction. Police transported Van der Sloot on the same day from Lima's Palace of Justice in an armored truck, while angry onlookers yelled and threw rotten lettuce. He was taken to the Miguel Castro Castro maximum security prison and placed in a cell near the prison director's office for his own safety.

He was registered as inmate 326390 and separated from the general prison population, under 24-hour guard, in a high-security cell block housing only one other inmate. Van der Sloot reportedly offered to disclose the location of Holloway's body in exchange for transfer to an Aruban prison, because he feared for his life. Peruvian president Garcia Pérez declared that Van der Sloot would have to stand trial for the homicide before any extradition request would be considered. He stated that Van der Sloot would serve his prison sentence in Peru. No treaty exists for the transfer of prisoners between Peru and the Netherlands.

On 15 June, Aruban and Peruvian authorities announced that they would cooperate in their respective cases involving Van der Sloot. Aruban investigators expected to be able to interview Van der Sloot in Peru in August, once Peruvian authorities had completed their investigation. At his first formal hearing within the on-site courtroom of Miguel Castro Castro prison on 21 June, Van der Sloot refused to discuss the case with Judge Carlos Morales Cordova, claiming that his right to due process had been violated. Van der Sloot filed a complaint with the National Police of Peru, accusing chief detective Miguel Angel Canlla Ore of misconduct. He also claimed that his laptop had been improperly searched.

Van der Sloot's defense counsel filed a motion of habeas corpus, disputing the legality of his detention, and to nullify statements he gave to police. The motion was declared baseless by Superior Court Judge Wilder Casique Alvizuri on 25 June. Casique Alvizuri upheld all three depositions given by Van der Sloot to police, and stated that the defendant's laptop was sealed by the court. Navarro vowed to appeal all the way to the Supreme Court of Peru and the Inter-American Court of Human Rights, with a legal strategy to "paralyze the process". The Peruvian court replied that this approach would not succeed in delaying the case against Van der Sloot.

Navarro stated that he filed suit against Chinchay, who initially represented Van der Sloot during his interrogation, charging her with abuse of authority, conspiracy to commit a crime, and misrepresentation, as he did not find her name on the list of public defenders from Peru's Ministry of Justice. Navarro also filed a complaint against Van der Sloot's translator, insisting that he misrepresented himself as an official translator of the Dutch embassy.

Chinchay rejected the claims against her, stating that Van der Sloot had selected her as a private attorney after declining another defense attorney, appointed by the state. She contradicted his claims that Van der Sloot did not understand what he was signing, stating that she was able to speak with him in perfect Spanish. She said that Van der Sloot expressed interest in talking about the Holloway case, thinking that it might get him extradited to Aruba. Chinchay also said that, when she told Van der Sloot that she noticed he was signing various documents with very different signatures, he signaled for her to be quiet.

Navarro stated on 21 August 2010 that the case was stagnating due to an official interpreter being unable to be found for the case in Peru. The Peruvian association of translators and interpreters and the Dutch embassy both separately stated at the time that they had been unable to locate anyone to officially translate Spanish into Dutch. Unlike Aruba and the United States, Peru does not guarantee the right to a speedy trial. On 6 September, a Peruvian appeals court voted 2 to 1 to reject Van der Sloot's motion that he was being unlawfully held. (Note: 2 to 1 is a rejection, because 3 votes are required for a decision; if a fourth judge voted in Van der Sloot's favor, a fifth judge would be required to break the tie.) Peruvian statutes permit a suspect to be detained for up to 18 months for interrogation, though Navarro expressed skepticism that law enforcement would do so with his client.

In February 2011, Navarro filed a "violent emotion" defense with the court, arguing that Van der Sloot had entered into a state of temporary insanity because Flores found out about his connection to Holloway from his laptop computer. Under Peruvian law, if the judge accepts this crime of passion argument, the sentence for such a plea could be reduced to only 3 to 5 years; Navarro noted that this could allow Van der Sloot to be eligible for parole in as soon as 20 months. Oscar González of the Peruvian police stated that an examination of Van der Sloot's laptop determined that Flores could not have accessed any such information while she was staying in the hotel room with him.

During the trial, the prosecution prepared a psychological investigation of Van der Sloot, saying that he "presents traits of an antisocial personality" and is "indifferent toward others' well-being".

=== Guilty plea and conviction ===
On 11 January 2012, Van der Sloot pleaded guilty to the "qualified murder" and simple robbery of Flores. He was convicted and sentenced to 28 years' imprisonment for the murder on 13 January and he must pay $75,000 to the Flores family. Hours after learning of the sentence, Van der Sloot was transferred to a maximum security prison, Piedras Gordas, located north of Lima. He was expected to be released on 10 June 2038 until his later drug trafficking conviction earned him additional time in prison.

In August 2014, Van der Sloot was transferred to Challapalca prison. Two months later, a Dutch online news service claimed that Van der Sloot was stabbed and critically injured by fellow prisoners in Peru. Van der Sloot's wife's claim of a stabbing is contested by Peruvian authorities.

=== Public reaction ===
Public outcry in Peru has been fueled by local media, which labeled Van der Sloot a "monster", "serial killer", and "psychopath". The coverage of this controversy highlighted cases of other women dying at the hands of foreigners. Peruvian and Colombian newspapers published articles about the investigation of the disappearance of two young women who frequented casinos during Van der Sloot's stay in at least two Bogotá hotels from 6 to 14 May 2010, prior to entering Peru.

The Administrative Department of Security of Colombia does not consider Van der Sloot a suspect, as they believe his presence in Bogotá was merely in transit to Peru. Dutch daily newspaper Trouw warned that the overwhelming pressure on authorities of Van der Sloot's presumed guilt risked turning the case into a show trial. The Dutch consulate told Peruvian authorities that it was concerned how Van der Sloot was being treated and presented to the media.

In December 2010, Time magazine named Van der Sloot's arrest the most notable criminal event of the year, ahead of the Belgian love triangle skydiving-murder case, the 2010 Chinese school attacks and the Elizabeth Smart kidnapping trial. ABC News listed the coverage of Van der Sloot's murder confession by Good Morning America among the most read stories from its website in 2010. The CBS affiliate near Holloway's hometown (Note: WIAT, in Birmingham, Alabama, is a CBS affiliate television station near Holloway's hometown. It has published several of the news reports, both on the air and on its website CBS 42, cited in this article.) named the criminal charges filed against Van der Sloot in 2010 among the top ten stories of the year. Radio Netherlands Worldwide identified him as one of the most talked about Dutch people of the year.

=== Media coverage at Miguel Castro prison ===
Van der Sloot's cell became the target of a media circus, with reporters vying to gain exclusive access and report about his prison surroundings. Since his incarceration, he has consented to interviews only with De Telegraaf, in which he admitted to extorting the Holloway family and said that he received a number of marriage proposals in his cell, including one from a woman who wanted to have his child. Van der Sloot reportedly receives fan mail from around the world, though mostly from women residing in the United States and the Netherlands. According to sources within the prison, Van der Sloot sought $1 million in exchange for an on-camera interview.

The Office of Internal Affairs of the National Penitentiary Institute of Peru began administrative and disciplinary action on 23 August 2010, when Peruvian network América Televisión aired a picture of Van der Sloot with three other inmates that had been taken with official photographic equipment at Miguel Castro Castro prison. The photo included Van der Sloot casually posing with Colombian hitman Hugo Trujillo Ospina, and American murderer William Trickett Smith II. Van der Sloot and Smith have been referred to by local media as "the foreigners accused of the most talked-about assassinations in our country".

On 11 September 2010, Beth Holloway and De Vries traveled to Peru with a Dutch television crew to visit the prison. According to Navarro, his client was taken to meet them "practically by force". Navarro stated that the meeting with Holloway took "less than one minute". Holloway said that she told Van der Sloot that she had "no hate in her soul" for him and asked about her daughter's disappearance, to which Van der Sloot responded he could not speak to her without his lawyer present and handed her Navarro's business card. However, Holloway also stated in interviews about the encounter:

I've hated him for five years. I wanted to peel his skin off.

— Beth Holloway, on Joran van der Sloot

According to Navarro, Holloway was sneaked into the prison without identifying to the Dutch television crew who she was. A prison spokesperson stated that Holloway's name was not found in the visitor registry. Holloway and the crew were removed from the prison, reportedly after a hidden camera was discovered by the guards. Representatives for Holloway and De Vries denied that a hidden camera was involved, or that anything was seized. Miguel Castro Castro prison warden, Alex Samamé Peña, was suspended after video segments of the confrontation between Holloway's mother and Van der Sloot later began airing on the Dutch network SBS6.

In October 2010, América Televisión broadcast video of a transaction for marijuana within the prison that was conducted by a shirtless man addressed as "gringo Van der Sloot". Navarro said that the situation was "staged" and asked the National Penitentiary Institute to investigate how it was leaked. Prison spokesperson Bruno Guzman said that Van der Sloot had been painting his cell "to improve his conditions" and the incident was being investigated.

Van der Sloot's mother, Anita, stated in a Dutch interview that her son could have killed Flores, and that she will not visit him at the prison. She said in another interview that she hopes to talk to the family of the victim and apologize to them.

I believe in karma, I believe that very strongly. I believe that if you do things that you shouldn't do, that a lot of shit happens to you," she said. "He didn't want to listen to his parents. He didn't listen to me, this last time. I tried to do my best. I don't think I could have done more. He's considered an adult right now. He has to do whatever he needs to do, and that is tell the truth (about) what happened.

— Anita Sloot-Hugen, 2010 Dutch televised interview

In February 2011, Navarro protested a decision by prison officials to deny Radio Netherlands Worldwide permission for a subsequent interview with Van der Sloot. Navarro claimed that the ruling was influenced by upcoming general elections.

== Drug trafficking in Peru ==
In February 2021, Van der Sloot was convicted of drug trafficking while serving his sentence in Challapalca Prison in Juliaca. He had set up a cocaine trafficking operation inside the prison, where a family member of a fellow detainee used sugar beets to smuggle cocaine into the prison in August 2020. Van der Sloot proceeded to deal the cocaine inside the prison, as well as setting up a trafficking network by forwarding packages of cocaine from the prison to other destinations abroad. He was eventually found out by prison officials.

Van der Sloot had an additional 18 years added to his original sentence. He is scheduled for release in 2045, because of a Peruvian law prohibiting prison sentences from exceeding a maximum of 35 years when the prisoner has not been sentenced to life imprisonment.

== Suicide attempt ==
On 12 December 2025, Peruvian prison guards found Van der Sloot seriously injured in his cell after having attempted suicide.

== Personal life ==
On 4 July 2014, Van der Sloot married a Peruvian woman named Leidy Figueroa, whom he met while she was selling goods inside the prison. She was seven months pregnant with his child at the time. On 28 September 2014, Figueroa gave birth to a daughter in Peru. By 2023, the couple was divorced.
