= Tracy Pollan =

American actress (born 1960)

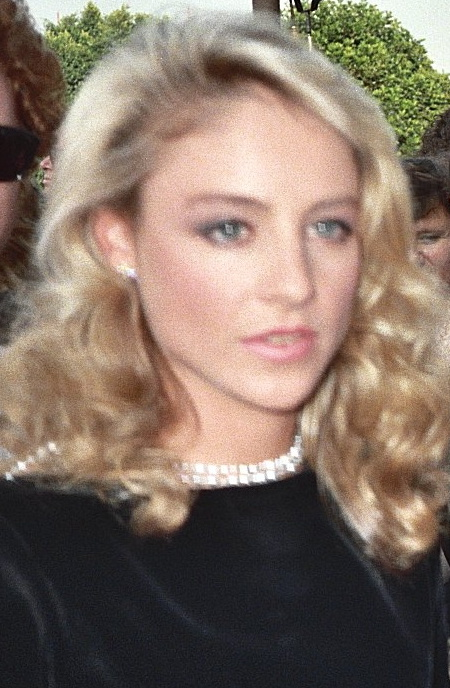
- Pollan at the 1987 Emmy Awards
- Born: Tracy Jo Pollan; June 22, 1960 (age 66); Long Island, New York, US
- Occupations: Actress; author
- Years active: 1980–present
- Spouse: Michael J. Fox (m. 1988)
- Children: 4
- Relatives: Michael Pollan (brother)

Tracy Jo Pollan Fox (née Pollan; born June 22, 1960) is an American actress. She is best known for playing Ellen Reed on the NBC sitcom Family Ties (1985–1987) and Harper Anderson on the crime drama series Law & Order: Special Victims Unit (2000), for which she received a Primetime Emmy Award nomination.

Pollan married actor and activist Michael J. Fox in 1988, and has since occasionally acted. In film, she has starred in the dramas Baby It's You (1983) and Promised Land (1987), the tragedy Bright Lights, Big City (1988) and the crime drama A Stranger Among Us (1992). Her other television credits include two episodes of Spin City (1997–1998) and TV films such as First to Die (2003), Natalee Holloway (2009) and Justice for Natalee Holloway (2011).

== Early life ==
Pollan was born to a Jewish family on June 22, 1960 on Long Island, and raised in Woodbury. Her parents are Corky and Stephen Pollan, and she has a brother, Michael. She attended Syosset High School, and graduated from the Dalton School in Manhattan, New York. She studied acting at the Herbert Berghof Studio and the Lee Strasberg Institute.

== Personal life ==
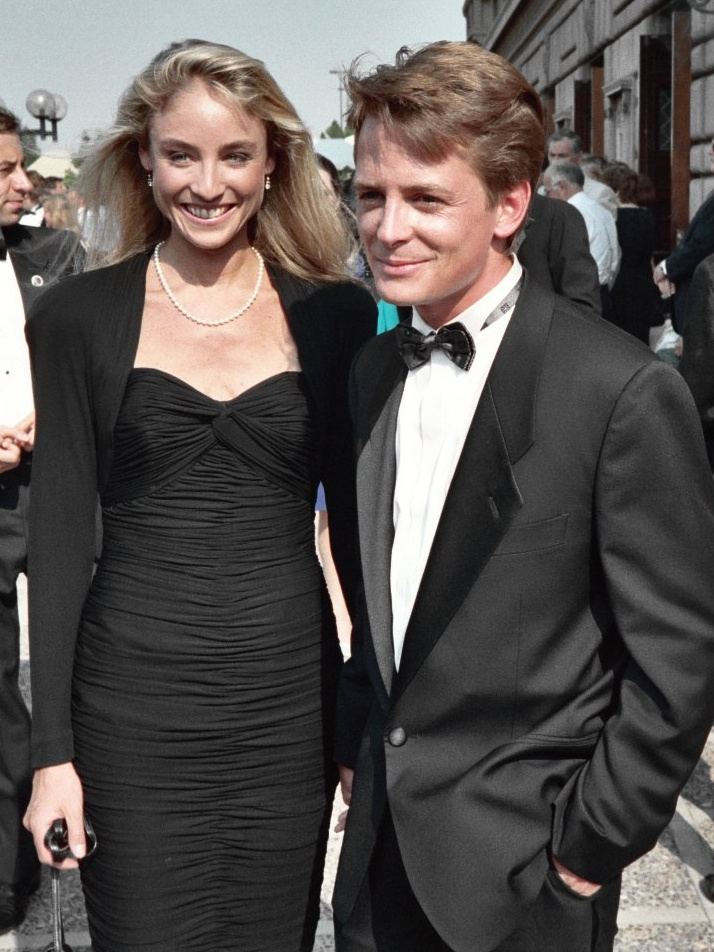
Pollan with husband Michael J. Fox at the 1988 Emmy Awards

Pollan met Michael J. Fox while working on the TV series Family Ties in 1985. Though they played a couple on the show, they did not date in real life at the time, and Pollan left the series after a year to pursue other acting opportunities. Pollan and Fox met again during the production of Bright Lights, Big City in 1987 and after beginning a relationship, they married on July 16, 1988. She then lessened her acting workload to focus on her marriage and family.

They have four children together: a son, Sam; twin daughters, Aquinnah Kathleen and Schuyler Frances; and a daughter, Esmé Annabelle. They reside in Manhattan. On June 22, 2024 (Pollan's 64th birthday), Schuyler married her long-time boyfriend at Hayfield in the Catskill Mountains.

== Publications ==
In October 2014, Pollan, along with her two sisters and mother, co-authored The Pollan Family Table, a cookbook of family recipes, kitchen tips and cooking techniques. The foreword was written by her brother, Michael.

In 2019, Pollan co-authored a plant-based diet cookbook, Mostly Plants: 101 Delicious Flexitarian Recipes from the Pollan Family.

== Filmography ==
=== Film ===
Year	Title	Role	Notes
1983	Baby It's You	Leslie	
1987	Promised Land	Mary Daley	
1988	Bright Lights, Big City	Vicky Allagash	
1992	A Stranger Among Us	Mara	

=== Television ===
Year	Title	Role	Notes
1982	For Lovers Only		Television film
1983	Sessions	Leslie	Television film
1983	Trackdown: Finding the Goodbar Killer	Eileen Grafton	Television film
1984	A Good Sport	Suzanne	Television film
1984	The Baron and the Kid	Mary Beth Phillips	Television film
1984	ABC Afterschool Special	Jen Robbins	Episode: "The Great Love Experiment"
1986	The Little Sister	Nicki Davis	Television film
1985–1987	Family Ties	Ellen Reed	Recurring role
1986	American Playhouse	Nicki Davis	Episode: "The Little Sister"
1987	The Abduction of Kari Swenson	Kari Swenson	Television film
1987	A Special Friendship	Elizabeth Van Lew	Television film
1990	The Kennedys of Massachusetts	Kathleen Kennedy	Miniseries; main role
1990	Fine Things	Elizabeth Kathleen "Liz" O'Reilly	Television film
1993	Dying to Love You	Lisa Ann Rohn	Television film
1994	Children of the Dark	Kim Harrison	Television film
1997–1998	Spin City	Renee Miller	2 episodes
1999	Anna Says	Anna	Television pilot; also executive producer
2000	Law & Order: Special Victims Unit	Harper Anderson	Episodes: "Closure" and "Closure, Part 2"
2003	Hench at Home	Kay Hench	Television film
2003	First to Die	Lindsay Boxer	Television film
2009	Medium	Caitlyn Lynch	Episode: "How to Make a Killing in Big Business"
2009	Natalee Holloway	Beth Holloway	Television film
2010	Law & Order: Criminal Intent	Patricia Caruso	Episode: "Traffic"
2011	Justice for Natalee Holloway	Beth Holloway	Television film
2013	The Michael J. Fox Show	Kelly	Episode: "Neighbor"
2016	Nightcap	Herself	Episode: "The Cannon"
2020	Goodbye, Jonathan!	Barbara	Episode: "The Creator"
2022	Inventing Anna	Sherry Reed	Episode: "A Wolf in Chic Clothing"

=== Theatre ===
Year	Title	Role	Notes
1980–1981	Album	Peggy	Cherry Lane Theatre
1985	Pack of Lies	Julie Jackson	Royale Theatre
1988	Woman in Mind	Lucy	New York City Center
1992	Jake's Women	Molly (age 21)	Neil Simon Theatre

== Awards and nominations ==
Awards and nominations received by Tracy Pollan
Award	Year	Category	Nominated work	Result	Ref.
Golden Raspberry Awards	1993	Worst Supporting Actress	A Stranger Among Us	Nominated	
Primetime Emmy Awards	2000	Outstanding Guest Actress in a Drama Series	Law & Order: Special Victims Unit	Nominated	
