= Carlos'n Charlie's =

Chain of casual dining Mexican restaurants

Carlos'n Charlie's is a chain of casual dining Mexican restaurants, primarily located in Mexican and Caribbean tourist destinations.

Carlos is Carlos Anderson, founder of Grupo Anderson's, who died in a 1990 plane crash, and Charlie is Charles Skipsey, his business partner. The company, founded in 1963, says that their more than 50 restaurants makes it Mexico's largest restaurateur. In addition to Carlos'n Charlie's, Grupo Anderson's has the Señor Frog's chain, along with other similarly-branded restaurants/bars like Carlos O'Brians and El Squid Roe.

Carlos'n Charlie's restaurants averaged $3.6 million in 2005 with an average check of $22.50. They expected sales to grow from $105 million to $112 million in 2006.

The parent company, Grupo Anderson's, is headquartered in Cancún, Mexico.

== Locations ==
=== Mexico ===
- Acapulco
- Cancún
- Cozumel
- Cuernavaca
- Ensenada
- Playa del Carmen
- Saltillo
- San Ángel, Distrito Federal, Mexico City

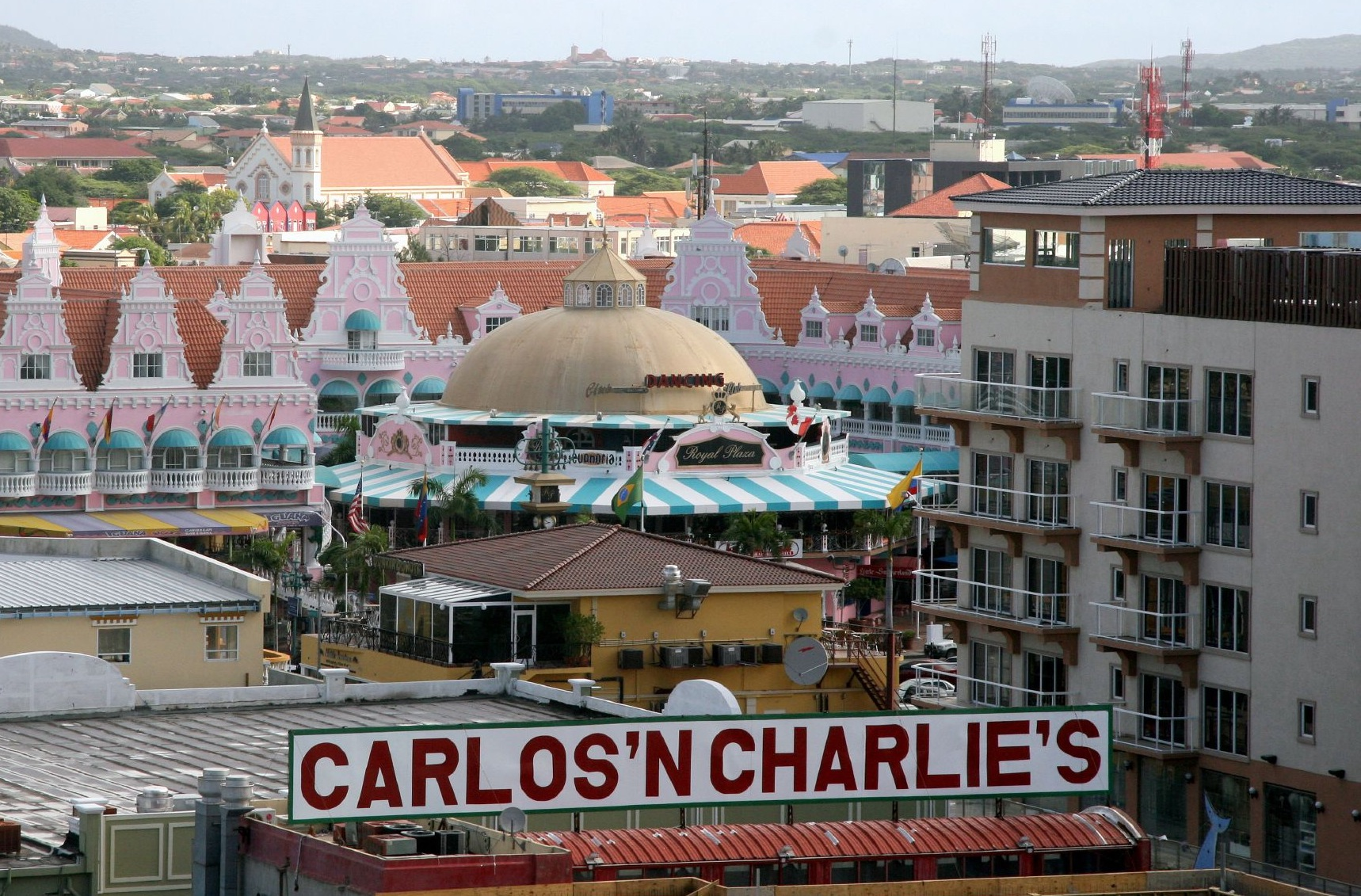
The former Carlos'n Charlie's in Oranjestad, Aruba, where Natalee Holloway was last seen before she disappeared.

=== United States ===
- West Palm Beach, Florida
- Las Vegas, Nevada

=== Former locations ===
- Manzanillo, Mexico
- Austin, Texas
- La Paz, Baja California Sur, Mexico
- Monterrey, Mexico
- Oranjestad, Aruba
- Lake Mary, Florida
- Myrtle Beach, South Carolina
- Chihuahua, Mexico
- Guatemala City, Guatemala
- New York, New York
- Los Angeles, California
- San Diego, California

The restaurant in Oranjestad, Aruba became a location of interest in the investigation of the disappearance of Natalee Holloway in 2005. Holloway was last seen leaving the establishment by her friends. Three years after Holloway's disappearance, the restaurant was closed and a nearby location in Palm Beach was opened under the sister brand of Señor Frog's.
