= Beth Holloway =

American speech pathologist and motivational speaker

- Born: Elizabeth Ann Reynolds; 1960 (age 65–66); Pine Bluff, Arkansas, U.S.
- Other names: Beth Twitty; Beth Holloway-Twitty
- Education: University of Arkansas at Little Rock; Arkansas State University
- Occupations: Speech pathologist Motivational speaker
- Spouses: David Edward "Dave" Holloway (div. 1993) George "Jug" Twitty (m. 2000; div. 2006)
- Children: 2, including Natalee

Elizabeth Ann Holloway (née Reynolds; born 1960) is an American speech pathologist and motivational speaker. She became widely known in the international media after her teenage daughter, Natalee, disappeared while going on a high school graduation trip to Aruba in 2005. Subsequently, Holloway became a speaker on the topic of personal safety. She founded the International Safe Travels Foundation—to educate the public to help them travel more safely— and the Natalee Holloway Resource Center to aid families of missing persons.

== Background ==
=== Early life and education ===
Holloway was born Elizabeth Ann Reynolds and raised in Pine Bluff, Arkansas to parents Ann (née Nichols) and Paul Mundell Reynolds. She later lived and worked in Tennessee. She received her bachelor's degree in speech pathology with a minor in special education from the University of Arkansas at Little Rock. She continued her studies at Arkansas State University in Jonesboro, where she received a master's degree in speech pathology.

=== Personal life ===
Beth Reynolds married college classmate Dave Holloway and settled in Clinton, Mississippi. They had a daughter Natalee Ann, who was born in Memphis, Tennessee in 1986, and a younger son Matthew. After the couple divorced in 1993, she raised her two children on her own. In 2000, Holloway married George "Jug" Twitty, an Alabama businessman, and moved with her children to Mountain Brook, Alabama. On December 29, 2006, Jug Twitty began divorce proceedings, stating the two have "such a complete incompatibility of temperament that the parties can no longer live together." Beth now lives in Birmingham, Alabama with her son Matthew and became grandmother of Matthew's daughter in 2015.

== Daughter's disappearance ==
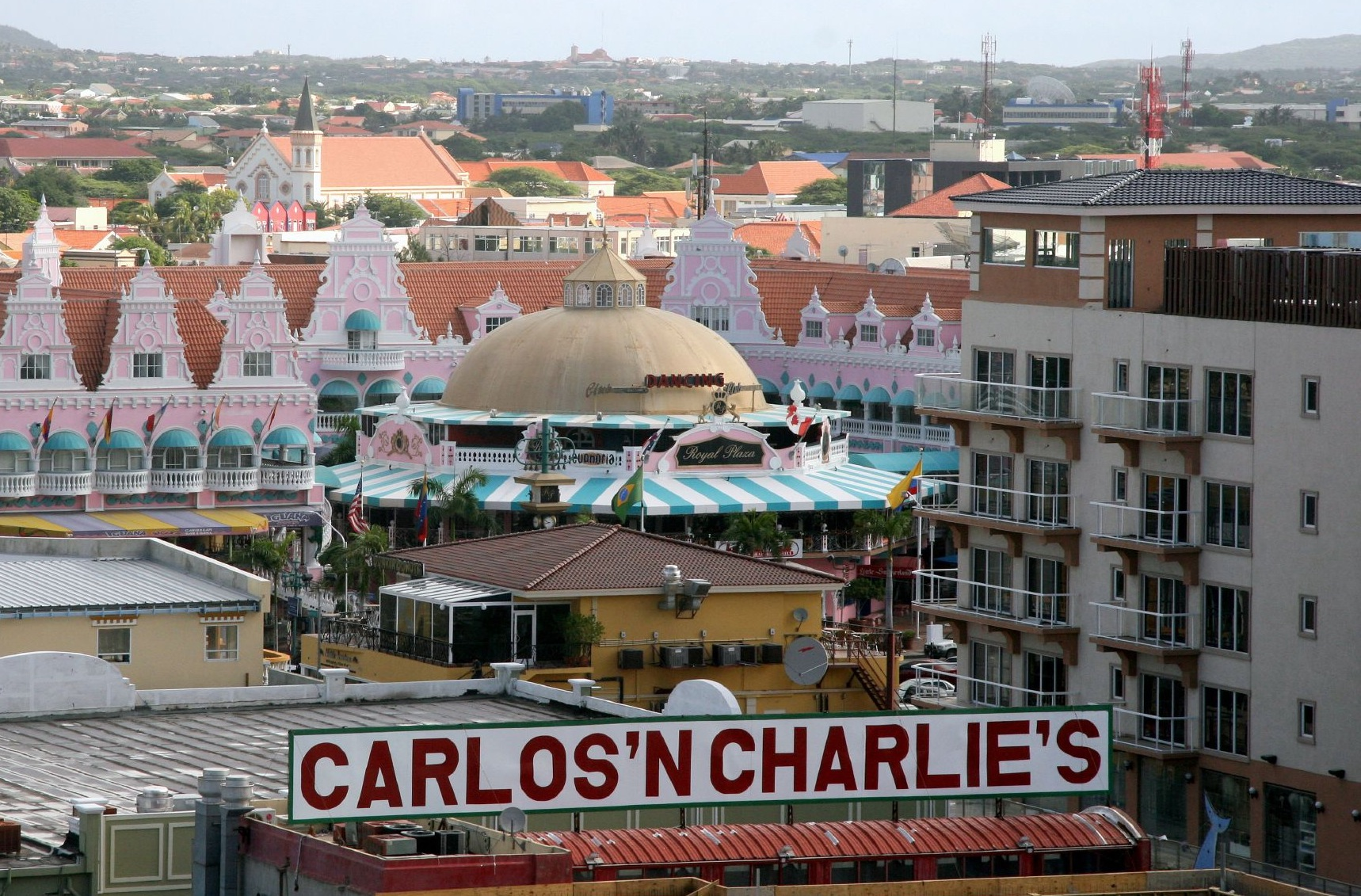
Carlos'n Charlie's, the restaurant where Natalee was last seen leaving with Joran van der Sloot

In May 2005, Holloway's daughter Natalee was in Aruba on a graduation trip with fellow students from Mountain Brook High School. Natalee was scheduled to fly home on May 30, but failed to appear for her flight. She was last seen by her classmates outside Carlos'n Charlie's, a Caribbean restaurant and nightclub in Oranjestad, in a car with locals Joran van der Sloot and brothers Deepak and Satish Kalpoe.

=== Involvement in investigation ===
Immediately after receiving word about Natalee's missed flight, Jug and Beth Twitty flew to Aruba with friends by private jet. Within four hours of landing in Aruba, the Twittys presented the Aruba Police Force with the name and address of Van der Sloot as the person with whom Natalee left the nightclub. Twitty stated that Van der Sloot's full name was given to her by the night manager at the Holiday Inn, who supposedly recognized him on a videotape. The Twittys and their friends, with two Aruban policemen, went to the Van der Sloot home looking for Natalee. Van der Sloot initially denied knowing Natalee's name, but he then told the following story, with which Deepak Kalpoe, who was present, agreed: Van der Sloot related that they drove Natalee to the California Lighthouse area of Arashi Beach because she wanted to see sharks, before dropping her off at her hotel around 2:00 a.m.

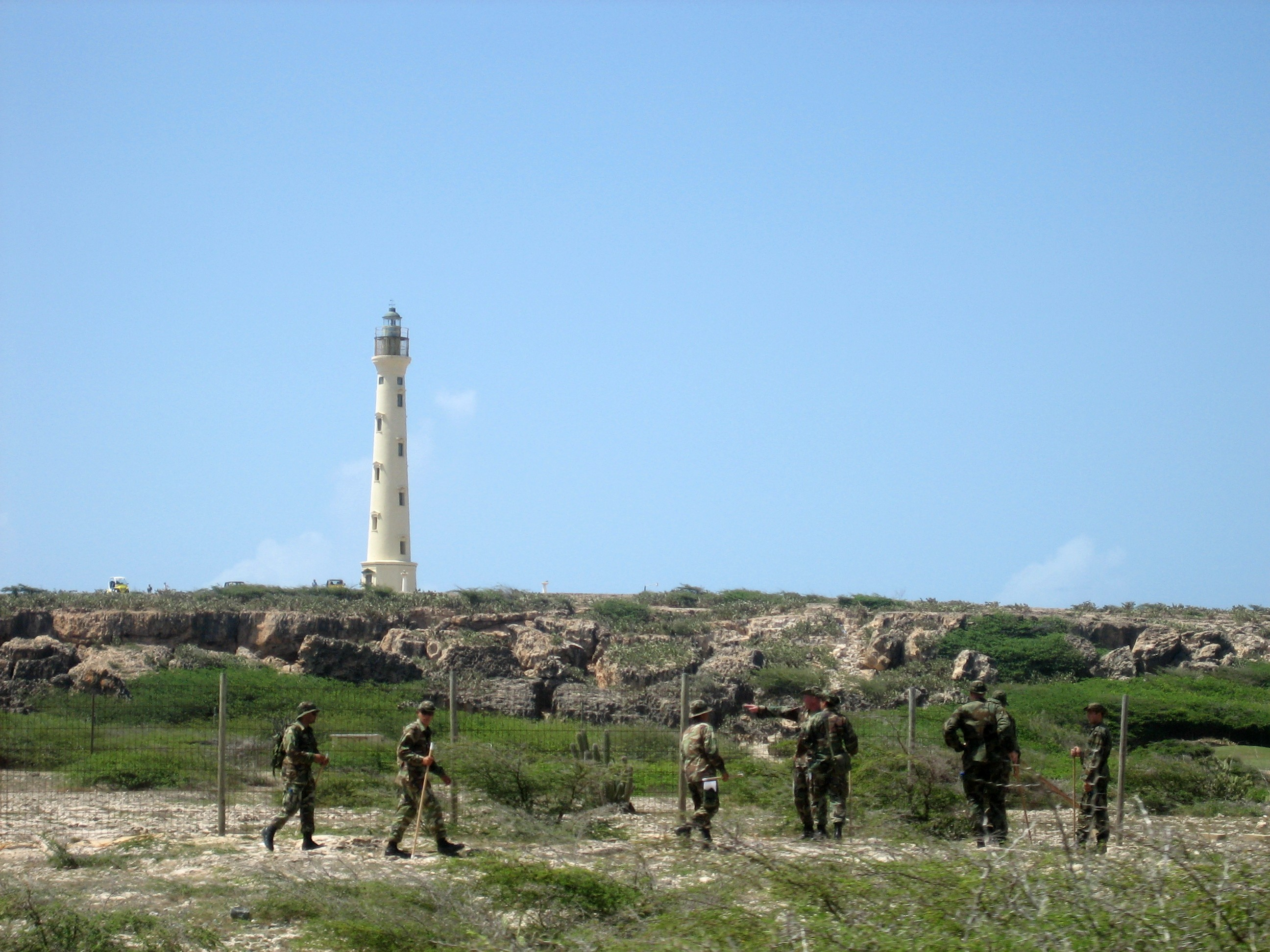
Dutch Marines vainly searching for Natalee Holloway near the California Lighthouse in Aruba

Beth Twitty alleged in televised interviews that Joran van der Sloot and the Kalpoe brothers knew more than they told, and that at least one of them sexually assaulted or raped her daughter. Holloway stated that she received copies of police statements stating that van der Sloot admitted having sex with Natalee at his home and described intimate details of her. She has never released copies of the alleged statement, though she characterizes them as admissions of "sexual assault" However, Vinda de Sousa, former Holloway/Twitty family attorney from Aruba understood that the admission may have been for consensual sex. In addition, former Aruban deputy police commissioner Gerold G. Dompig denied that any such statement was made, stating that Van der Sloot and the Kalpoe brothers consistently denied having sex with Natalee.

On June 12, 2005, three days after the arrest of van der Sloot and the Kalpoe brothers, and in response to a nationally televised address by Aruba Prime Minister Nelson Oduber reaffirming Aruba's commitment to solving the case, Twitty stated, "I'm not getting any answers." She added, "I don't feel any further along than the day I got here." Twitty subsequently stated that her complaints were not addressed specifically at the Aruban government, but arose from frustration at not knowing what happened to her daughter.

On July 5, 2005, following the initial release of the Kalpoes, Twitty alleged, "Two suspects were released yesterday who were involved in a violent crime against my daughter", and referred to the Kalpoes as "criminals". A demonstration involving about two hundred Arubans took place that evening outside the courthouse in Oranjestad in anger over Twitty's remarks, with signs reading "Innocent until proven guilty" and "Respect our Dutch laws or go home". After Satish Kalpoe's attorney threatened legal action over Twitty's allegations, which he described as "prejudicial, inflammatory, libelous, and totally outrageous", Twitty read a prepared statement on July 8, 2005, that said her remarks were fueled by "despair and frustration" and that she "apologize[d] to the Aruban people and to the Aruban authorities if I or my family offended you in any way".

==== Criticism ====
Twitty was criticized for her focus on Joran van der Sloot and the Kalpoe brothers, to the exclusion of any other theory as to what happened to Natalee. However, a confession from van der Sloot in 2023, as part of a plea deal, appears to vindicate this focus. According to the lawsuit filed by the Kalpoe brothers, she has (on various television programs) repeatedly accused them and van der Sloot of "sexual assault" and "gang rape" of her daughter.

Twitty was also criticized for making what have been deemed to be inconsistent and contradictory statements (for example, as to whether there were operating security cameras at the Holiday Inn). According to Julia Renfro, U.S.-born editor of the Aruban tourist-oriented newspaper, Aruba Today, who befriended Holloway in the early days of the investigation, Holloway pandered to tabloid television and her "behavior was odd from the get-go". Renfro noted that "Holloway immediately concluded that her daughter had been kidnapped and made no effort to check hospitals or police", adding that within a couple of days, after fixing responsibility on Joran van der Sloot, Twitty "was telling TV interviewers that she knew her daughter had been gang-raped and murdered".

=== Media coverage ===
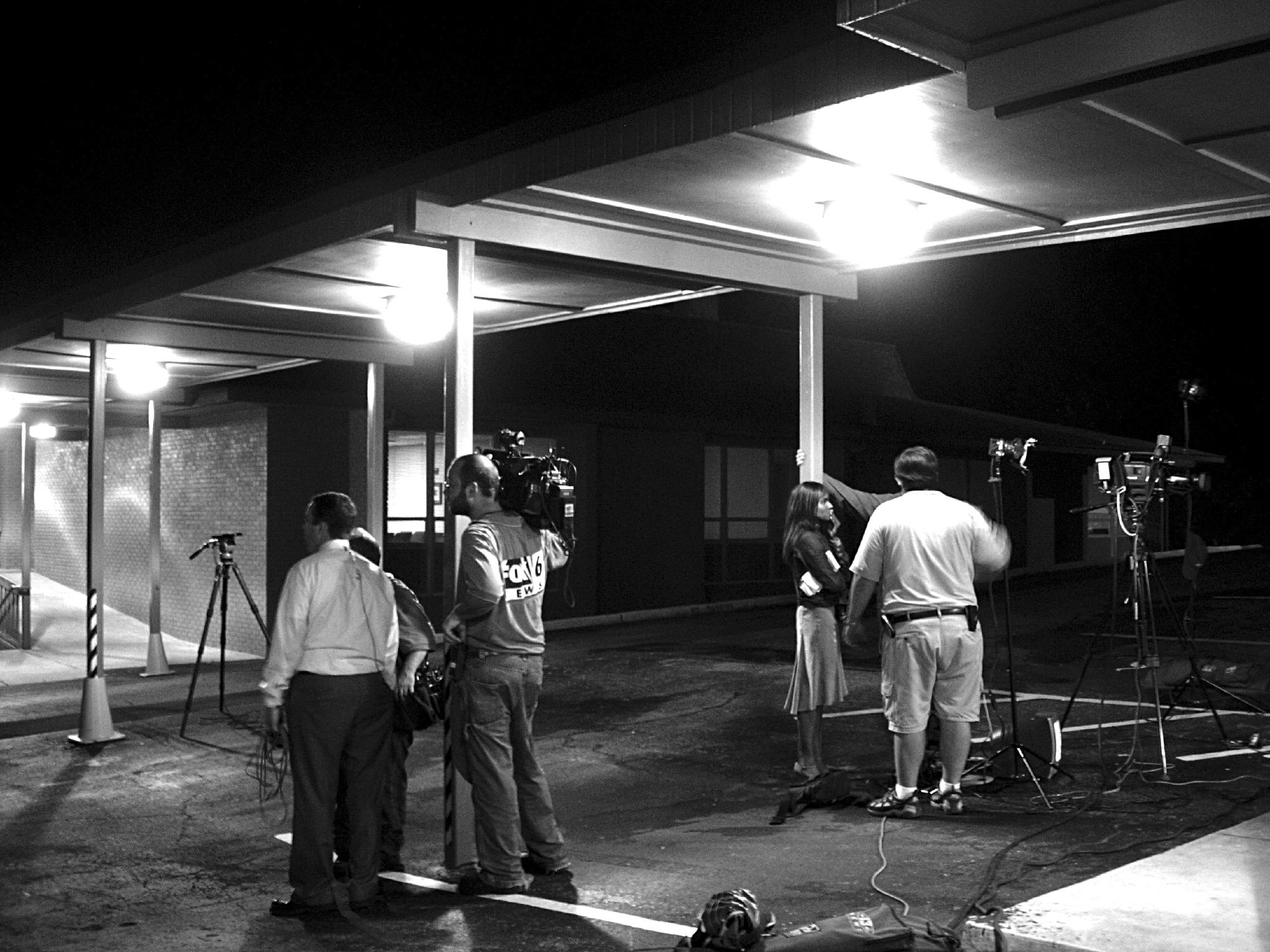
News crews covering the disappearance of Twitty's daughter

On February 16, 2006, Joran van der Sloot and his father Paul were in New York City for an interview with ABC Primetime when they were served with a lawsuit filed by Twitty and her former husband David Holloway. The lawsuit alleged personal injury against Natalee Holloway and also alleged that Van der Sloot's father created a permissive environment. However, the case was dismissed on jurisdictional grounds on August 3, 2006.

On February 3, 2008, an undercover exposé produced by crime reporter Peter R. de Vries aired on Dutch television showing video of Van der Sloot purportedly smoking marijuana and admitting to being present during Holloway's death. The show became the most watched non-sports program in Dutch television history. Following the airing of the program, Beth Twitty, adhering to the position that the tapes represent the way events transpired, believed that Van der Sloot dumped Natalee's body, possibly alive, into the Caribbean. She told the New York Post that her daughter would still be alive if Van der Sloot had called for help. On September 22, 2008, in New York, De Vries accepted an International Emmy Award in Current Affairs for his coverage while accompanied by Holloway.

Twitty also alleged that the person who van der Sloot supposedly called that evening was his father Paul, who according to Holloway "orchestrated what to do next". She and Dave Holloway alleged that Joran van der Sloot was receiving "special legal favors". After the court decision not to rearrest Van der Sloot was affirmed, Twitty stated, "I think that what I do take comfort in, his life is a living hell", later adding, "I'd be good with a Midnight Express prison anywhere for Joran."

"I think he is a time bomb and he will strike again."

— Beth Holloway

==== Book ====
Twitty said that she vowed to share her story shortly following her daughter's disappearance, in the hope that other families would not suffer what she had to go through. After searchers had spent five months in an unsuccessful quest to find Natalee, her attorney John Q. Kelly took over the case and she spent the next two years traveling to various high schools and colleges to present messages about personal safety. When she thought about reaching more travelers with her story, Twitty said that her efforts evolved into writing a book.

HarperOne, an imprint of HarperCollins published Loving Natalee: A Mother's Testament of Hope and Faith on October 2, 2007. Written under the name "Beth Holloway" following her divorce from Jug Twitty, the book retells events leading up to the night Natalee Holloway disappeared in 2005, and the ensuing investigation during the aftermath. It then focuses on the obstacles faced in Aruba by the Holloway and Twitty families in their search for Natalee. Holloway recounts her anger at what she felt was a lack of cooperation from local officials such as the Aruban police, including the failure to obtain a warrant to search the home of Van der Sloot. The book was soon on The New York Times best seller list.

==== Film adaptation ====
In October 2008, the Lifetime Movie Network announced plans to create a television film based on the book. Jarett Wieselman of the New York Post questioned whether it was too soon for such a film to be made. Twitty said that she was not sure at first that she could take this step, but felt that it was "the right thing to do" after meeting the creative staff in Los Angeles.

On April 19, 2009, Lifetime aired Natalee Holloway, starring Tracy Pollan as Beth Holloway-Twitty, Grant Show as George "Jug" Twitty, Amy Gumenick as Natalee Holloway and Jacques Strydom as Joran van der Sloot. The film re-enacts Natalee's disappearance and stages re-creations of various scenarios, based on the testimony of key players and suspects. The broadcast of the film attracted 3.2 million viewers, garnering the highest television ratings in the network's history at the time. Although it set ratings records for Lifetime, the movie was not received well by critic Alec Harvey of The Birmingham News. Harvey called the movie "sloppy and uneven, a forgettable look at the tragedy that consumed the nation's attention for months". However, Jake Meaney of PopMatters found the film to be surprisingly "calm and levelheaded", and praised Tracy Pollan's portrayal of Beth. Twitty said that she was honored by Pollan's portrayal and that there "could not have been a better choice."

=== Extortion ===
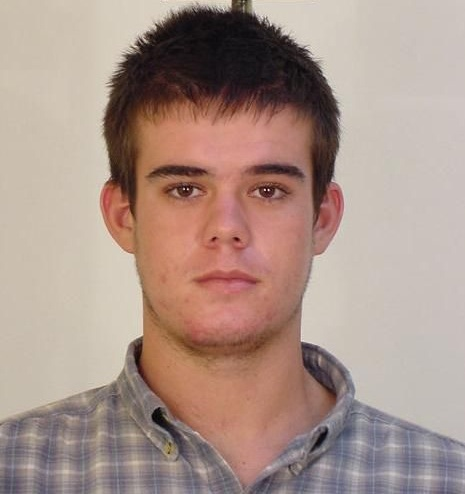
Mug shot of Joran van der Sloot

Around March 29, 2010, Joran van der Sloot contacted Twitty's attorney John Q. Kelly with an offer to reveal the location of her daughter's body and the circumstances surrounding her death for an advance of US$25,000 against a total of $250,000. Kelly said that he secretly went to Aruba in April to meet with Van der Sloot, who was desperate for money, and gave him $100. Kelly notified the Federal Bureau of Investigation to set up a sting operation with the Aruban authorities. On May 10, Van der Sloot accepted the amount of $15,000 by wire transfer from Birmingham to his account in the Netherlands, following a cash payment of $10,000 that was videotaped by undercover investigators in Aruba. In exchange, Van der Sloot told Kelly that his father buried Natalee's remains in the foundation of a house. Authorities determined that the information that he in return provided was false, because the house had not yet been built at the time of Natalee's disappearance. Van der Sloot later e-mailed Kelly that he lied about the house. Holloway was shocked that the FBI did not promptly file extortion charges against Van der Sloot, allowing him to leave freely with the money to Bogotá, Colombia, on his way to Lima, Peru. The FBI and the Office of the U.S. Attorney in Birmingham later claimed in a joint statement that they were working as quickly as possible and that the Lima murder was in no way the result of them allowing Van der Sloot to flee Aruba with the extorted money.

On June 3, 2010, the U.S. District Court of Northern Alabama charged Van der Sloot with extortion and wire fraud. On June 30, 2010, a federal grand jury formally indicted Van der Sloot of the two charges. The indictment filed with the U.S. District Court seeks the forfeiture of the $25,100 that had been paid to Van der Sloot from Holloway's private funds. Van der Sloot was apprehended on June 3 in Chile and is presently serving a 28-year prison sentence in a Peruvian prison for robbing and murdering 21-year-old Stephany Flores in Lima on the fifth anniversary of Natalee's disappearance. Although Twitty made television appearances as new developments arose, she was directed by the FBI not to discuss her daughter's case or that of Flores.

On June 8, 2023, Joran van der Sloot was officially extradited to the United States to face trial for extortion and wire fraud against Holloway. He would be arraigned in the federal courthouse in Birmingham, Alabama.

=== Prison visit with Van der Sloot ===
In a September 2010 interview from the prison, Van der Sloot admitted to extorting Twitty, stating: "I wanted to get back at Natalee's family — her parents have been making my life tough for five years." On September 11, Twitty traveled to Peru with Peter R. De Vries and his Dutch television crew to visit the prison. According to Van der Sloot's attorney Maximo Alonso Altez Navarro, his client was taken "practically by force" to a meeting with Twitty that took "less than one minute." Altez Navarro said that when Twitty asked questions about the disappearance of her daughter, Van der Sloot responded by saying that he could not speak to her without his lawyer present and handing her his lawyer's business card. Altez Navarro claimed that Twitty was "snuck" into the prison without being identified by the Dutch media crew who she was with. A prison spokesperson stated that Twitty's name was not found in the visitor registry. Colonel Abel Gamarra of the Peruvian National Police stated that no arrests had been made. Twitty's attorney John Q. Kelly commented, "I know she didn't tell me ahead of time because I would have asked her to exercise a little more caution." While in Peru, Twitty spoke with Flores's brother Enrique on camera. On September 17, Holloway and the group left the country for Panama and arrived in Aruba on the same day. Twitty spent a few days in Aruba working with De Vries on a documentary about her missing daughter to be run on Dutch television, reportedly with the cooperation of prosecutors who had been investigating Van der Sloot. The video premiered in November 2010 on SBS6 in the Netherlands and as a special episode of 48 Hours on CBS in the United States, resulting in the suspension of Miguel Castro Castro prison warden Alex Samamé Peña.

== Advocacy ==
In response to Natalee's disappearance, Twitty founded the International Safe Travels Foundation, a non-profit organization designed "to inform and educate the public to help them travel more safely as they travel internationally".

In May 2009, before the fourth anniversary of her daughter's disappearance, Twitty was accompanied by America's Most Wanted host John Walsh as Natalee's case was added to the cold case exhibit on display at the National Museum of Crime & Punishment in Washington, D.C. In April 2010, Twitty announced plans for a service called "Mayday 360," to intervene immediately when young people get into trouble overseas. She stated that if necessary, former federal agents with specific knowledge of a country could be dispatched there. On June 8, 2010, the Natalee Holloway Resource Center opened at the National Museum of Crime & Punishment to aid families of missing persons.
