= Peter R. de Vries =

Dutch investigative journalist and reporter (1956–2021)

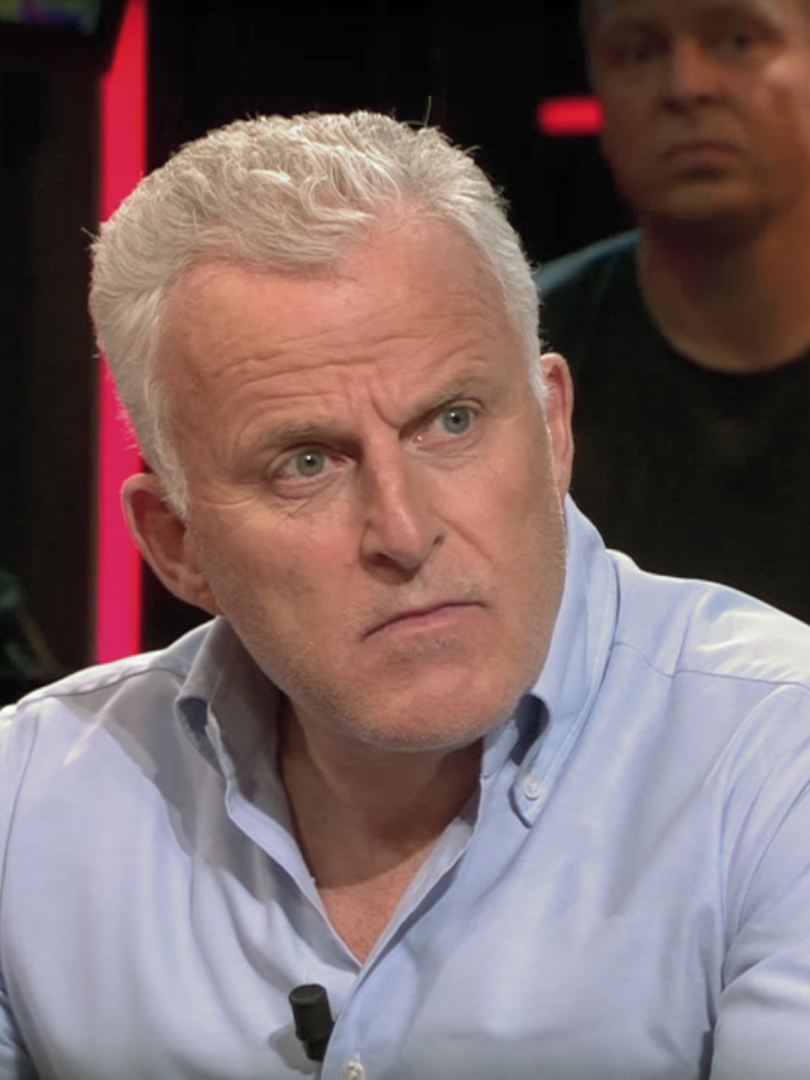
- De Vries in 2017
- Born: Peter Rudolf de Vries; 14 November 1956; Aalsmeer, Netherlands
- Died: 15 July 2021 (aged 64); Amsterdam, Netherlands
- Cause of death: Murder by gunshot
- Occupations: Investigative journalist Crime reporter Columnist
- Years active: 1978–2021
- Children: 2
- Website: peterrdevries.nl

Peter Rudolf de Vries (14 November 1956 – 15 July 2021) was a Dutch investigative journalist and crime reporter. His television program Peter R. de Vries, misdaadverslaggever (Crime Reporter; 1995–2012) covered high-profile cases and set a Dutch television viewing record. For decades he was famous in the Netherlands for his works in unsolved crimes. He also became internationally renowned for his programme covering the disappearance of Natalee Holloway. In 2005, he founded his own political party which was disbanded soon after.

On 6 July 2021, De Vries was shot in the head after leaving the television studio of RTL Boulevard in Amsterdam where he had appeared as a guest. He was taken to the VU University Medical Center in critical condition, where he died nine days later.

== Early life and career ==
Peter Rudolf de Vries was born on 14 November 1956 in Aalsmeer in the Netherlands. He attended primary school in Amstelveen and secondary school in Amsterdam. From 1976 to 1977, he was conscripted into the Royal Netherlands Army, where he achieved the rank of sergeant.

In 1978, De Vries became a journalist for the daily newspaper De Telegraaf in The Hague and later in Amsterdam. He gradually moved from general journalism to crime reporting by covering major criminal cases in the Netherlands. In 1987, he resigned from De Telegraaf and became chief editor of the weekly magazine Aktueel, which he transformed into a crime magazine.

== Investigative journalism ==
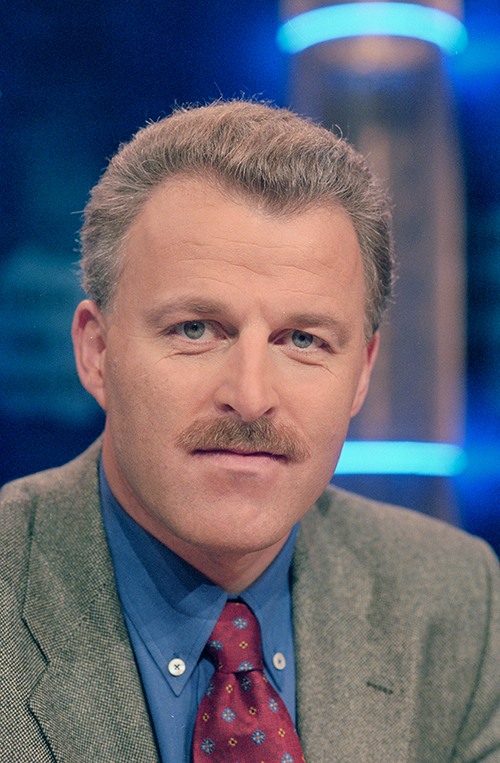
Peter R. de Vries in 1995

De Vries previously worked for several publications and was an unaffiliated crime journalist from 1991. He investigated the murder of Christel Ambrosius, and revealed that Mabel Wisse Smit knew the drug lord Klaas Bruinsma better than she had previously admitted, before she married Prince Friso, a brother to the king. Another important issue in his show was a found floppy-disk. This disk contained detailed information from AIVD research, the Dutch secret service. It turned out that the service observed the murdered politician Pim Fortuyn; the service thought that he had sexual relations with Moroccan men.

=== Kidnapping of Freddy Heineken ===
In 1983, De Vries followed the case of the kidnapping of Freddy Heineken for the Dutch newspaper De Telegraaf. He attended proceedings and sometimes visited the hotels in France where the kidnappers Cor van Hout and Willem Holleeder were being held under arrest.

He wrote two books based on his investigation. The first was De zaak Heineken (The Heineken Case, 1983), released in the same year as the kidnapping. This was followed by De ontvoering van Alfred Heineken (The Kidnapping of Alfred Heineken, 1987), a novel from the perspective of Cor van Hout based on interviews De Vries conducted with Van Hout and Holleeder over a period of four weeks during their last hotel arrest in Évry, Essonne in 1986. The novel was later adapted as Kidnapping Freddy Heineken} (2015) starring Anthony Hopkins as Freddy Heineken.

In 1994, De Vries tracked down Frans Meijer, one of the kidnappers, in Paraguay.

=== Louis Hagemann ===
In 2001, De Vries took up two unsolved murders from the 1980s, namely the triple murder of Corina Bolhaar and her two daughters in 1984 and the disappearance of Joanne Wilson in 1985. The Netherlands is one of the few countries in the world to have a statute of limitations on murder, which stands at 18 years after the offense is committed, which gave De Vries only a short period of time to expose the killer. De Vries accused Louis Hagemann, a member of the Hells Angels Amsterdam chapter, of the murders as he exposed new evidence that the Amsterdam police had overlooked. The Hells Angels attacked De Vries's camera crew with rocks in an attempt to intimidate De Vries into ceasing the investigation of Hagemann. The statute of limitations expired on the murder of Joanne Wilson before any charges could be filed, but Hagemann was convicted of the murders of Bolhaar family.

=== Police corruption investigation ===
On 13 September 2006, De Vries was arrested in Oisterwijk and detained for several hours in Tilburg when he tried to confront a police officer with allegations about questionable actions concerning the inheritances of elderly women. He was charged with one count of trespassing. The case was dropped in January 2007 "in view of the final results of the persistent search for the truth and the results of the disciplinary inquest" into the behavior of the police officer in question.

=== Kennedy investigation ===
In the first half of 2006, De Vries and Wim Dankbaar produced a two and a half hour special about the 1963 assassination of U.S. president John F. Kennedy. In what was De Vries' longest show to date, he spent two weeks in Texas speaking with former CIA and FBI agents and the ex-girlfriend of Lee Harvey Oswald. One of the interview subjects, James Files, said he was the gunman responsible for taking Kennedy's life. Files contradicted the findings of the Warren Commission and claimed that the CIA and the mafia were involved in the assassination.

=== Natalee Holloway disappearance ===
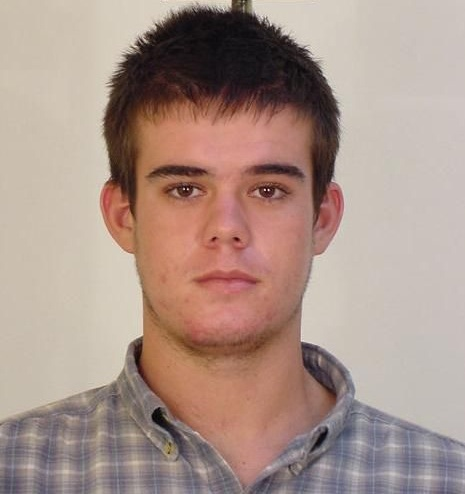
Police photo of Joran van der Sloot

In November 2006, a program by De Vries was broadcast in which he accused Joran van der Sloot, one of the prime suspects in the disappearance of Natalee Holloway in Aruba.

On 11 January 2008, Van der Sloot threw a glass of red wine in De Vries' face right after a live broadcast of the Dutch talk show Pauw & Witteman on which De Vries and Van der Sloot (with his parents) had been guests. The wine got into De Vries' eyes and briefly it seemed to have caused him a considerable amount of pain. During the tense but peaceful conversation during the broadcast, De Vries had on several accounts challenged Van der Sloot's integrity.

On 31 January 2008, De Vries said to the media that he knew what had happened in the case of Natalee Holloway. He shared his findings with the police, stating that he would publicly show this new-found evidence in a special episode of his television program. On 3 February 2008, the undercover video aired on Dutch television showing Van der Sloot purportedly smoking marijuana and admitting to being present during Holloway's death. The show was watched by 7 million viewers in the Netherlands and was the most viewed non-sports program in Dutch television history. Patrick van der Eem, working undercover for De Vries, had befriended Van der Sloot, who was unaware that he was being taped when he said that Holloway had suffered some kind of seizure while having sex on the beach. After failing to revive her, he said that he summoned a friend named Daury, who loaded her on a boat and dumped her body into the sea. The prosecutor in Aruba determined the video was admissible, but the evidence was deemed insufficient to warrant re-arrest. Although the taped confession appeared damning, Van der Sloot argued that he was lying to impress Van der Eem, who he believed was a drug dealer. Van der Eem said that ABC paid US$830,000 to secure the rights to broadcast the program in the United States.

De Vries wrote the introduction to the June 2008 book Overboord: hoe ik Joran van der Sloot aan het praten kreeg (Overboard: how I got Joran van der Sloot to talk) in which Van der Eem recounts his experience with Van der Sloot with transcripts of the undercover video. On 22 September 2008, in New York, De Vries accepted an International Emmy Award in Current Affairs for his coverage while accompanied by Natalee's mother Beth Holloway.

==== Joran van der Sloot sex trafficking ====
In November 2008, De Vries aired undercover footage of Van der Sloot making preparations for the apparent sex trafficking of Thai women in Bangkok. De Vries claimed that Van der Sloot was making $13,000 for every woman sold into prostitution in the Netherlands. Van der Sloot used the alias of "Murphy Jenkins" to avoid Thai authorities. Peruvian Minister of Justice Aurelio Pastor said that Thailand is pursuing criminal charges against Van der Sloot. According to The National Enquirer, he is being investigated for his involvement in the disappearance of young women he may have recruited for a Thai sex slave gang while posing as a production consultant for a modeling agency that would send them to Europe.

=== Death of Mariska Mast ===
In August 2010, De Vries traveled to Subiaco, Western Australia in an attempt to interview dive instructor Daniel Ian Ross, who is being sought through Interpol for the August 2008 death of 23-year-old Dutch tourist Mariska Esmeralde Mast on the Honduran island of Roatán. Ross was initially arrested and released after surrendering his British passport with instructions not to leave the island. Ross, who has dual citizenship, then used his Australian passport to leave the island. Ross denied responsibility for the death through his lawyers in Australia, which does not have an extradition treaty with Honduras. An autopsy report stated that Mast died of blunt force injuries and asphyxiation resulting from strangulation. His flatmate Jisoo Han, who helped take Mast to hospital, was later arrested and is under house arrest in Honduras. Han publicly appealed to Ross to come forward and exonerate her. Ross called the police when De Vries attempted to contact him at his home on 19 August. De Vries was arrested and paid a $200 fine for disobeying a police order to move on. On 6 September Perth magistrate Giuseppe Cicchini rejected an application by Ross for a restraining order against De Vries, who had by then left the country. De Vries criticized the Western Australia Police for arresting him, stating: "I didn't touch him, I didn't insult him, I didn't threaten him... This is a homicide case and I tracked him down and now you're putting me in jail. That's the world upside down."

=== Documentary work with Beth Holloway ===
On 11 September 2010, De Vries traveled to Lima, Peru, with his television crew and Beth Holloway to visit Miguel Castro Castro prison where Joran van der Sloot was being held while awaiting trial for the murder and robbery of Stephany Tatiana Flores Ramírez. According to Van der Sloot's attorney Maximo Alonso Altez Navarro, his client was taken to meet them "practically by force." Altez Navarro stated that the meeting with Holloway took "less than one minute," with Van der Sloot saying that he could not speak to her without his lawyer present and handing her his business card. Altez Navarro claimed that Holloway was "snuck" into the prison without being identified by the media crew who she was with. A prison spokesperson stated that Holloway's name was not found in the visitor registry. The group was removed from the prison, reportedly after a hidden camera was discovered by the guards. Representatives for Holloway and De Vries denied that a hidden camera was involved nor was anything seized. Colonel Abel Gamarra of the National Police of Peru stated that no arrests had been made. While in Peru, Holloway spoke with Flores Ramírez's brother Enrique on camera. On 17 September De Vries and the group left Peru for Panama and arrived in Aruba on the same day. He spent a few days in Aruba working with Holloway on a documentary about her missing daughter to be run on Dutch television, with the cooperation of prosecutors who had been investigating Van der Sloot.

== Politics ==
In 2005, De Vries started a political party, Partij voor Rechtvaardigheid, Daadkracht en Vooruitgang (P.R.D.V. or Party for Justice, Action and Progress). On 31 October he presented his plans that mainly focused on changing the existing political culture in the Netherlands. To prove his point, he stated that an opinion poll on 16 December would decide whether he would actually continue his party or not, with a 41% cut-off point. Since only 31.4% thought De Vries would be a gain for Dutch politics, he decided to disband the party.

== Lawyers' and investigations office ==
Together with criminal lawyer Khalid Kasem, in October 2017 de Vries and his son Royce de Vries established a lawyer's office in Diemen (Amsterdam South-East area) De Vries & Kasem – Lawyers / Investigations. Not a lawyer himself, he became the company director, and worked for clients in regard to their media matters or providing a second opinion.

== Marengo trial ==
In 2021, De Vries supported the crown witness in the Marengo trial.

== Death ==
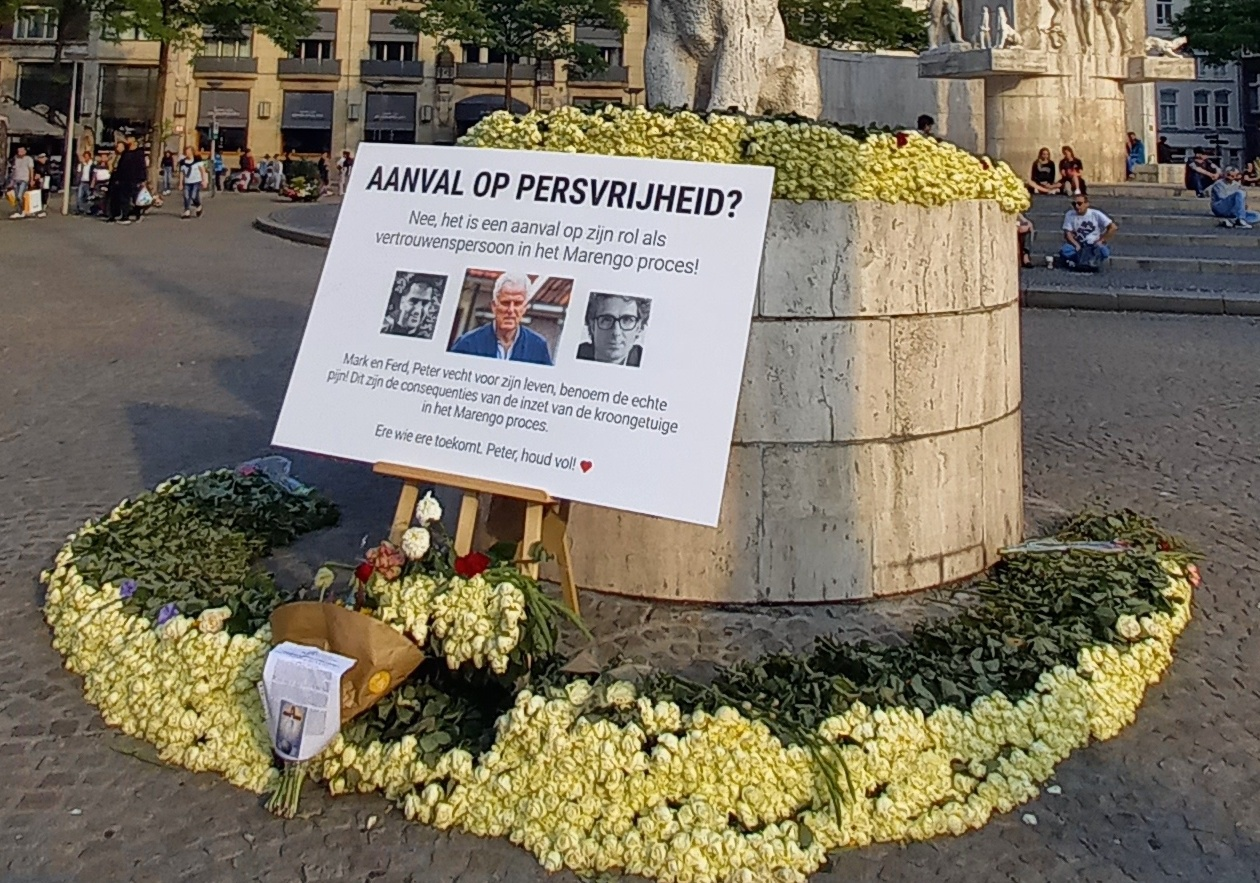
A memorial for De Vries

On 6 July 2021, after leaving the television studio of RTL Boulevard in Amsterdam where he had appeared as a guest, five bullets were fired at him in the Lange Leidsedwarsstraat. De Vries was shot in the head. He was taken to a hospital in critical condition. The Dutch police arrested three suspects that same evening, one of whom was released the next day, as he was no longer a suspect. De Vries died as a result of the shooting on 15 July 2021. The killing of De Vries was condemned by the Director-General of the UNESCO Audrey Azoulay in a press-release published on the 15th of July. According to global monitoring on the safety of journalists by the Observatory of Killed Journalists, he was the first media professional killed in the Netherlands in 2021.

On the third anniversary of his death in 2024, a monument was unveiled on Leidseplein in Amsterdam.

=== Perpetrators ===
Nine suspects in the murder were scheduled to be tried starting on 23 January 2024. Later that year, on 12 June, a court in the Netherlands sentenced three men to 28 years in prison for the murder of De Vries, and three other men to 14 years for aiding the murderers.

== Personal life ==
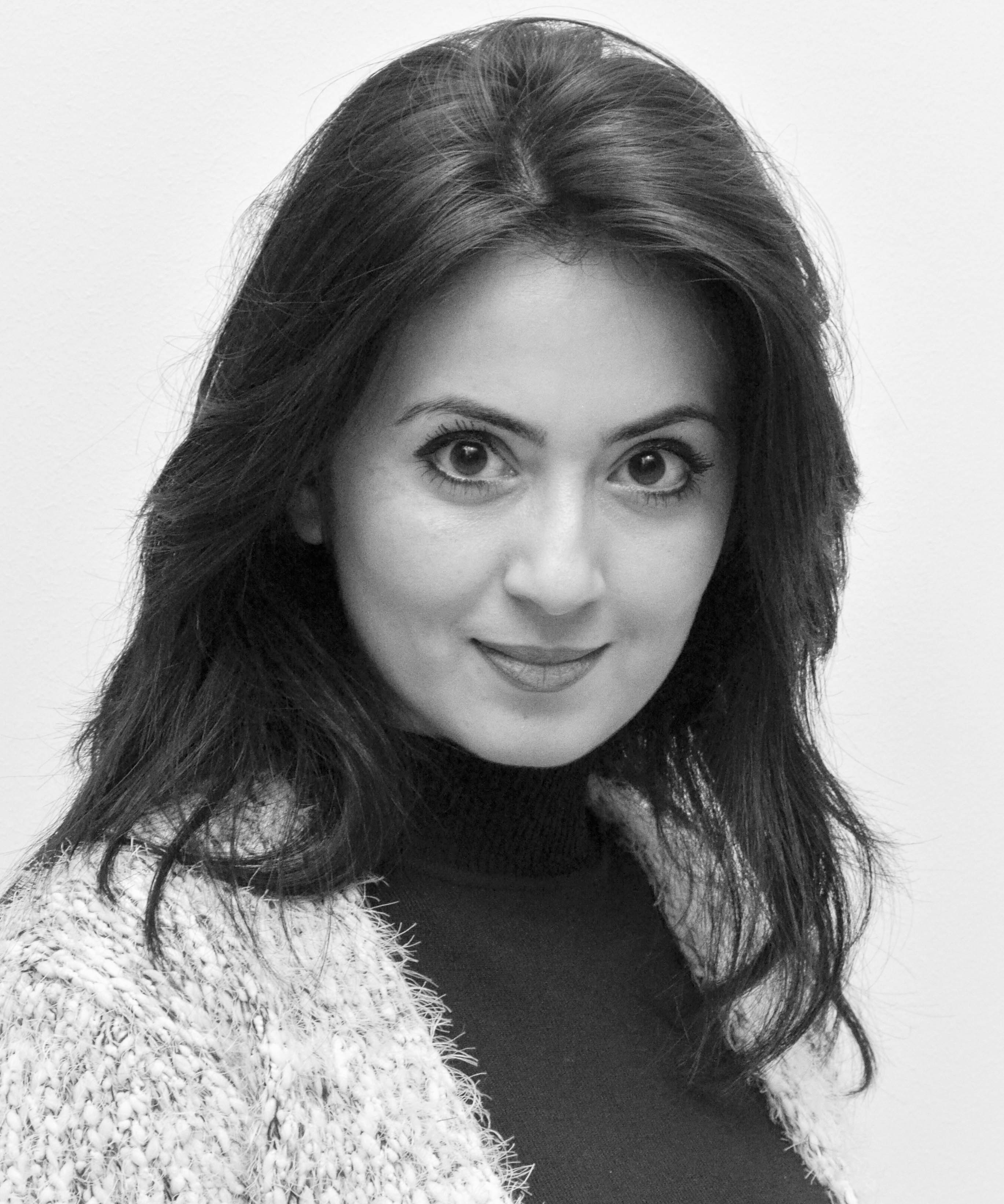
Tahmina Akefi, the partner of De Vries, who he had planned to marry at the time of his assassination

De Vries was married for 35 years to Jacqueline and they had a son and daughter named Royce and Kelly. They divorced in 2013. From 2015 until his death, he was in a discreet relationship with a Dutch Afghan writer and journalist, Tahmina Akefi. Akefi revealed the relationship on 30 January 2022 and said that the couple planned to marry in summer 2022, and that they were going to publicise it.

== Bibliography ==
- De zaak Heineken ("The Heineken Case", 1983)
- Veronica 25 jaar toonaangevend (1984)
- Uit de dossiers van commissaris Toorenaar ("From the files of Police Captain Toorenaar", 1985)
- De ontvoering van Alfred Heineken ("The Kidnapping of Alfred Heineken", 1987), adapted as Kidnapping Freddy Heineken (2014) starring Anthony Hopkins
- Beroep: Misdaadverslaggever ("Profession: crime reporter", 1992)
- Cipier, mag ik een pistool van u? ("Warden, may I have a gun?", 1993)
- Een moord kost meer levens ("A murder takes more lives", 1994) ISBN 90-261-0692-0
- De moord die nooit mag verjaren, en andere minireportages ("The murder that should never expire, and other mini-reports", 2002) ISBN 90-261-1868-6
- Alleen huilebalken hebben spijt ("Only crybabies have regrets", 2005) ISBN 90-261-2229-2
- Een crimineel liegt niet altijd... en andere waargebeurde misdaadverhalen ("A criminal doesn’t always lie... and other true crime stories", 2006) ISBN 978-90-261-2188-3
- De zwanenzang van criminelen en andere reportages ("The swan song of criminals and other reports", audiobook, 2007) ISBN 978-90-261-2334-4

=== Board game ===
- Peter R. de Vries Misdaadverslaggever ("Peter R. de Vries crime reporter") ISBN 978-90-261-1924-8

== Filmography ==
- De Grote Sinterklaasfilm (2020)
- De Grote Sinterklaasfilm: Trammelant in Spanje (2021)

== See also ==
- Lucia de Berk
- Kevin Sweeney case

== Books ==
- Sher, Julian; Marsden, William (2006). Angels of Death: Inside the Bikers' Empire of Crime. Toronto: Alfred Knopf Canada. ISBN 9780307370327.
