= Peter R. de Vries: Crime Reporter =

Dutch television show

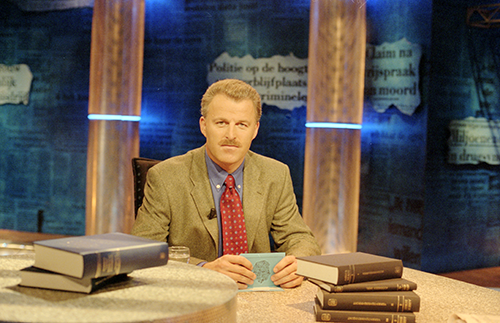
- Peter R. de Vries: Crime Reporter
- Dutch: Peter R. de Vries, misdaadverslaggever
- Genre: Investigative journalism Criminal investigation Docudrama
- Created by: Peter R. de Vries
- Directed by: Ary Schouwenaar; Robert Arthur Jansen; Kees van der Spek; Evert Nijkamp; Chantal van Schuylenburch
- Creative director: Peter R. de Vries
- Presented by: Peter R. de Vries
- Narrated by: Arend Langenberg
- Theme music composer: Martijn Schimmer
- Composer: Martijn Schimmer
- Country of origin: Netherlands
- Original languages: Dutch; English
- No. of seasons: 20
- No. of episodes: 264

Production
- Executive producers: Peter R. de Vries; Sander Dekkers; Paul Cormont
- Producers: Karen de Groot; Simon Vuyk; Dirk Bayens; Henny de Vos; Kees van der Spek; Chantal van Schuylenburch
- Cinematography: Kees van der Spek
- Editor: Rick Lankreijer
- Production company: Endemol

Original release
- Network: RTL 4 (1995–1998); SBS6 (1998–2012)
- Release: 10 October 1995 – 3 June 2012

Related
- Oplichters in het buitenland

Peter R. de Vries: Crime Reporter (Dutch title: Peter R. de Vries, misdaadverslaggever) was a Dutch investigative television program covering high-profile criminal cases. Created and presented by Peter R. de Vries the program ran from 1995 until 2012.

== Cases ==
=== Police corruption investigation ===
On 13 September 2006, De Vries was arrested in Oisterwijk and detained for several hours in Tilburg when he tried to confront a police officer with allegations about questionable actions concerning the inheritances of elderly women. He was charged with one count of trespassing. The case was dropped in January 2007 "in view of the final results of the persistent search for the truth and the results of the disciplinary inquest" into the behavior of the police officer in question.

=== Kennedy investigation ===
In the first half of 2006, De Vries and Wim Dankbaar produced a two and a half hour special about the 1963 assassination of U.S. president John F. Kennedy. In what has been De Vries' longest show to date, he spent two weeks in Texas speaking with former CIA and FBI agents and the ex-girlfriend of Lee Harvey Oswald. One of the interview subjects, James Files, said he was the gunman responsible for taking Kennedy's life. Files contradicted the findings of the Warren Commission and claimed that the CIA and the mafia were involved in the assassination.

=== Natalee Holloway disappearance ===
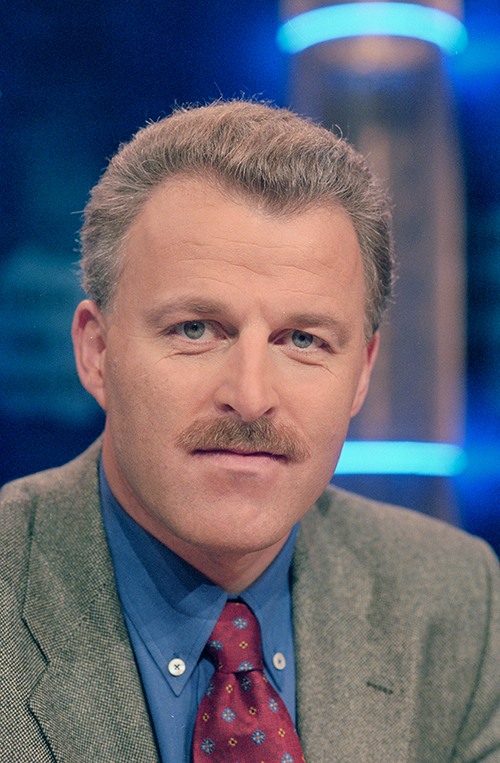
Peter R. de Vries

In November 2006, an episode was broadcast in which he accused Joran van der Sloot, one of the prime suspects in the disappearance of Natalee Holloway, of her disappearance in Aruba.

On 11 January 2008, Van der Sloot threw a glass of red wine in De Vries' face right after a live broadcast of the Dutch talk show "Pauw & Witteman" on which De Vries and Van der Sloot (with his parents) had been guests. The wine got into De Vries' eyes and briefly it seemed to have caused him a considerable amount of pain. During the tense but peaceful conversation during the broadcast, De Vries had on several accounts challenged Van der Sloot's integrity.

On 31 January 2008, De Vries said to the media that he knew what had happened in the case of Natalee Holloway. He shared his findings with the police, stating that he would publicly show this new-found evidence in a special episode of his television program. On 3 February 2008 the undercover video aired on Dutch television showing Van der Sloot purportedly smoking marijuana and admitting to being present during Holloway's death. The show was watched by 7 million viewers in the Netherlands and was the most popular non-sports program in Dutch television history. Patrick van der Eem, working undercover for the program, had befriended Van der Sloot, who was unaware that he was being taped when he said that Holloway had suffered some kind of seizure while having sex on the beach. After failing to revive her, he said that he summoned a friend named Daury, who loaded her on a boat and dumped her body into the sea. The prosecutor in Aruba determined the video was admissible, but the evidence was deemed insufficient to warrant re-arrest. Although the taped confession appeared damning, Van der Sloot argued that he was lying to impress Van der Eem, who he believed was a drug dealer. Van der Eem said that ABC paid US$830,000 to secure the rights to broadcast the program in the United States.

De Vries wrote the introduction to the June 2008 book Overboord: hoe ik Joran van der Sloot aan het praten kreeg (Overboard: how I got Joran van der Sloot to talk) in which Van der Eem recounts his experience with Van der Sloot with transcripts of the undercover video. On 22 September 2008, in New York, De Vries accepted an International Emmy Award in Current Affairs for his coverage while accompanied by Natalee's mother Beth Holloway.

=== Joran van der Sloot sex trafficking ===
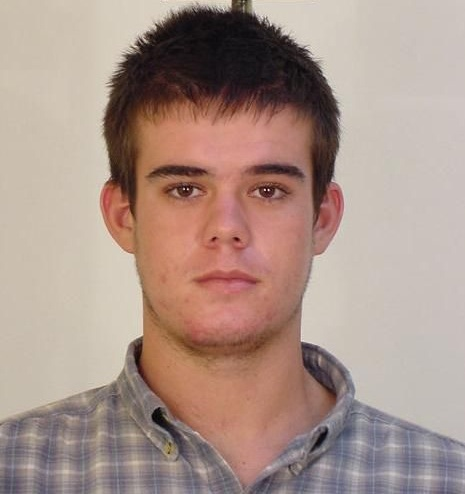
Joran van der Sloot

In November 2008, the program aired undercover footage of Van der Sloot making preparations for the apparent sex trafficking of Thai women in Bangkok. De Vries claimed that Van der Sloot was making $13,000 for every woman sold into prostitution in the Netherlands. Van der Sloot used the alias "Murphy Jenkins" to avoid Thai authorities. Peruvian Minister of Justice Aurelio Pastor said that Thailand is pursuing criminal charges against Van der Sloot. According to The National Enquirer, he is being investigated for his involvement in the disappearance of young women he may have recruited for a Thai sex slave gang while posing as a production consultant for a modeling agency that would send them to Europe.

=== Death of Mariska Mast ===
In August 2010, De Vries traveled to Subiaco, Western Australia in an attempt to interview dive instructor Daniel Ian Ross, who is being sought through Interpol for the August 2008 death of 23-year-old Dutch tourist Mariska Esmeralde Mast at the Honduran island of Roatán. Ross was initially arrested and released after surrendering his British passport with instructions not to leave the island. Ross, who has dual citizenship, then used his Australian passport to leave the island. Ross denied responsibility for the death through his lawyers in Australia, which does not have an extradition treaty with Honduras. An autopsy report stated that Mast died of blunt force injuries and asphyxiation resulting from strangulation. His flatmate Jisoo Han, who helped take Mast to the hospital, was later arrested and was put under house arrest in Honduras. Han publicly appealed to Ross to come forward and exonerate her. Ross called the police when De Vries attempted to contact him at his home on August 19. De Vries was arrested and paid a $200 fine for disobeying a police order to move on. On September 6, Perth magistrate Giuseppe Cicchini rejected an application by Ross for a restraining order against De Vries, who had by then left the country. De Vries criticized the Western Australia Police for arresting him, stating: "I didn't touch him, I didn't insult him, I didn't threaten him... This is a homicide case and I tracked him down and now you're putting me in jail. That's the world upside down."

=== Documentary work with Beth Holloway ===
On 11 September 2010, De Vries traveled to Lima, Peru with his television crew and Beth Holloway to visit Miguel Castro Castro prison where Joran van der Sloot was being held while awaiting trial for the murder and robbery of Stephany Tatiana Flores Ramírez. According to Van der Sloot's attorney Maximo Alonso Altez Navarro, his client was taken to meet them "practically by force." Altez Navarro stated that the meeting with Holloway took "less than one minute," with Van der Sloot saying that he could not speak to her without his lawyer present and handing her his business card. Altez Navarro claimed that Holloway was "snuck" into the prison without being identified by the media crew who she was with. A prison spokesperson stated that Holloway's name was not found in the visitor registry. The group was removed from the prison, reportedly after a hidden camera was discovered by the guards. Representatives for Holloway and De Vries denied that a hidden camera was involved nor that anything was seized. Colonel Abel Gamarra of the National Police of Peru stated that no arrests had been made. While in Peru, Holloway spoke with Flores Ramírez's brother Enrique on camera. On 17 September De Vries and the group left Peru for Panama and arrived in Aruba on the same day. He spent a few days in Aruba working with Holloway on a documentary about her missing daughter to be run on Dutch television, reportedly with the cooperation of prosecutors who had been investigating Van der Sloot.
