= Kevin Sweeney =

Kevin Sweeney may refer to:

- Kevin Sweeney (American football) (born 1963), American football player
- Kevin J. Sweeney (born 1970), Roman Catholic bishop of Paterson, New Jersey
- Kevin Sweeney, convicted of murder of his wife Suzanne, see Kevin Sweeney case
