= Louis Hagemann =

Dutch Hells Angel

Louis Hagemann (born 1953), better known as "Long Louis", is a Dutch Hells Angel convicted of several murders.

== The Wilson case ==
Hagemann joined the Hells Angels Amsterdam chapter and was involved in a number of criminal activities such as selling drugs, armed robberies and extortion. Hagemann was known as one of the more violent Dutch Hells Angels. The Canadian journalists Julian Sher and William Marsden noted that Hagemann "...had more than a hundred convictions for aggravated rape, drugs, armed robbery, assault, torture and tossing a hand grenade at a police officer". Hagemann was described as a tall, muscular man who wore his long hair in a ponytail with a red bandana always tied around his forehead.

In 1983, he befriended a young couple from Belfast, Stephen Hampton and Joanne "Jo" Wilson, who had settled in Amsterdam to escape "the Troubles" of Northern Ireland. Hampton worked in a bar where Hagemann was a regular patron while Wilson worked as a hotel maid. Hampton called Hagemann "very friendly" and through him he came to know Wilson. Like many other women, Wilson found herself unable to resist the "bad boy" sex appeal of a gangster, and was involved in a secret affair with Hagemann. Wilson was described as being "fascinated" with the Hells Angels. In March 1984, someone had broken into an Amsterdam apartment to stab to death Corina Bolhaar and two of her young children. Bolhaar was an airline stewardess with KLM, the Dutch national airline. It is believed that she was smuggling drugs for the Hells Angels.

On 20 September 1985, Wilson vanished. Hampton worked until 4 am as a bartender and came home to his apartment where Wilson made him breakfast. She told she would be leaving for most of the day, but would be home for dinner. That was the last time that Hampton ever saw Wilson. Wilson spoke with a friend at the Central Station later that day and said she was going to meet someone. That was the last known sighting of Wilson. Hampton was surprised when Wilson failed to show up for dinner as she had promised. The next day, he started phoning all of her friends to ask if they had seen her, but no one had. Hampton went to the police, who dismissed the meeting as a mere lovers' quarrel, but did allow Hampton to file a missing person report. Hampton, who became increasingly frantic as it became apparent that Wilson was gone, launched his own search for her. Hampton, who was unaware at the time of Wilson's affair with Hagemann, was joined by him, but the duo found no clues.

The torso of Wilson's dismembered corpse was found floating in a plastic bag in the Amsterdam-Rijn canal six weeks later by a sluice-gate operator. The torso had been stabbed several times. Her entire body was never recovered as Wilson's head, arms, and one of her legs were never found. Her left leg was later found in the same canal, likewise wrapped in a plastic bag. Hagemann was the prime suspect in Wilson's disappearance as he was a violent criminal, the torso was found floating only 300 yards from his apartment, and just before she vanished Wilson had mentioned to a friend she was going to see her "special friend Louis". The Amsterdam police regarded Wilson's murder as a minor concern and "callously" named the investigation of her disappearance "Operation Annoyance". The police refused to treat the Wilson case as a murder as they insisted that there was no evidence that the torso found floating in the canal was Wilson's even though the pubic hair found on the torso matched that of Wilson's pubic hair in photographs of her in the nude and the left leg was wearing one of her sandals. Ann Donaghy, the mother of Wilson, remained convinced that Hagemann had killed her daughter, and doggedly pursued the case for decades. Donaghy's request that the remains of her daughter be returned to County Armagh to be buried was refused by the Amsterdam police who stated that there was no evidence that the torso and leg was all that was left of Wilson. The Wilson case became well known in the United Kingdom and Ireland. Donaghy told Sher and Marsden in an interview that the Amsterdam police made her life a "complete hell" as the police seemed to have no interest in Operation Annoyance as they labelled Wilson's disappearance.

== The Bolhaar case — Peter R. de Vries: Crime Reporter ==
In 1998, Hagemann was convicted of raping his ex-girlfriend, Renetta van der Meer. In 2001, the Dutch journalist Peter R. de Vries covered on his television show Peter R. de Vries, misdaadverslaggever (Peter R. de Vries: Crime Reporter) the massacre of the Bolhaar family in their apartment in March 1984. The Netherlands is one of the few countries in the world to have a statute of limitations on murder, which stands at 18 years after the offense is committed. Sher and Marsden wrote "it's not good law, but as the clock ticks it can make great TV". Knowing the statute of limitations on the Bolhaar case would expire in March 2002, de Vries decided to look into the case, and discovered that Hagemann was the prime suspect in the murders, but that the detectives had not pursued him. De Vries started to interview witnesses relating to the Bolhaar case and in the process discovered the Wilson case as well. The Dutch Hells Angels disapproved of de Vries's investigation and at one point attacked his camera crew with rocks in a bid to intimidate him into abandoning the investigation.

De Vries made a breakthrough when he interviewed Hagemann's embittered ex-girlfriend, Renetta van der Meer, whom he had fathered a child by and then abandoned. Meer in a television interview with de Vries stated that when she was living with Hagemann he often bragged to her about killing a woman in 1984 along with "her brats". She also stated that Hagemann had boasted to her about strangling to death a girlfriend whose corpse he had dismembered, feeding parts of her body to the pigs on a farm owned by another Hells Angel and dumping other parts of the body into a canal. Meer stated: "He laughed about how he walked around with one of her arms after cutting the body into pieces in a bath. It was horrible. He told me he would do the same with me if I ever crossed him". In support of her claims that Hagemann was an extremely violent man, Meer recounted how she was hospitalized after he had tried to strangle her to death in a jealous rage and how he shot an ex-boyfriend of hers in the leg in an unsuccessful attempt to castrate him in another jealous rage. In support of his theory that Hagemann had killed Wilson, de Vries revealed that Wilson's passport had been found buried under the wallpaper in the apartment that Hagemann was living in at the time Wilson vanished in September 1985. Hagemann had been evicted from that apartment for non-payment of rent in 1986, and the next tenant discovered buried in the wall Wilson's passport, which he found very odd..

With only a week to go before the statute of limitations expired, de Vries aired an episode of his TV show in 2002 that accused Hagemann of killing Wilson, Bolhaar and her children. The Amsterdam police were forced very much against their wills to reopen both cases. The Dutch police had dumped the torso discovered in 1985 in an unmarked grave which had been turned into a landfill, meaning the body was now lost forever. However, a police technician had taken a sample of blood from the torso in 1985 and DNA testing revealed that the blood was from Wilson.

At the time the episode aired in 2002, Hagemann was in prison for rape. One man who lived in the same cell as Hageman told de Vries that he often bragged about how he smashed in the head of a girlfriend with a sledgehammer, dismembered her corpse and fed parts of her to the pigs. However, the Dutch police refused to charge Hagemann with the murder of Wilson under the grounds that no motive was known and the Crown needed a motive to lay charges of murder. The statute of limitations expired on the Wilson case in September 2003 before any murder charges were filed. After the statute of limitations expired with the Wilson murder, Hagemann spoke with de Vries who summarized their meeting as: "He told me he'd kill me if he got a chance".

== Convictions ==
In 2003, Hagemann was convicted of the murders of Corina Bolhaar, her 9-year-old daughter Donna and her six-year son Sharon. The Bolhaar murders, which involved two children being stabbed to death, was considered to be an especially vicious crime. Willem van Boxtel, the president of the Hells Angels Amsterdam chapter, appeared at the sentencing hearing to ask for a lenient sentence as he spoke highly of Hagemann's character. Because the statute of limitations expired in 2003, he was never charged with Wilson's murder. Donaghy in a statement to the press after he was convicted of the Bolhaar murders stated: "Now he will not be punished for murdering my beautiful daughter. He will live the rest of his life as an innocent man as far as Joanne's death is concerned. The Amsterdam police have a lot to answer for". Donaghy thanked de Vries for his efforts as she stated in a 2004 interview: "If it hadn't been for Peter and his team, Hagemann was still be at large. They were superb and travelled over to Portadown during their investigations. They kept in touch with me virtually every day, forced a re-opening of the case and put the Dutch authorities to shame".

While he was in prison, he married Jacqueline Kallenbach, the former wife of Irish crime boss Christy Kinahan. In 2014, the couple were the subject of the documentary Levenslang, which detailed Jacqueline Kallenbach's efforts to have him freed as she believed that he was wrongly convicted.

== Books ==
- Sher, Julian; Marsden, William (2006). Angels of Death: Inside the Bikers' Empire of Crime. Toronto: Alfred Knopf Canada. ISBN 9780307370327.
