= Julia Renfro =

Aruban journalist

Julia Renfro is the editor-in-chief of the English-language Aruba Today News Magazine and the photographer for the Dutch-based Bon Dia.

Renfro has become a source for American media on the Natalee Holloway case.
