= Disappearance of Natalee Holloway =

2005 disappearance in Aruba

Natalee Holloway
- Senior portrait of Natalee Holloway in 2004
- Born: Natalee Ann Holloway; October 21, 1986; Memphis, Tennessee, U.S.
- Disappeared: May 30, 2005 (aged 18); Oranjestad, Aruba, Netherlands
- Status: Missing for 21 years, 5 months and 20 days; declared dead on January 12, 2012
- Education: Mountain Brook High School
- Parents: David Holloway; Beth Holloway

On May 30, 2005, Natalee Ann Holloway, an 18‑year‑old recent high school graduate from Mountain Brook, Alabama, disappeared while on a trip to Aruba. She was last seen outside the Oranjestad nightclub Carlos'n Charlie's, entering a car with Joran van der Sloot and brothers Deepak and Satish Kalpoe. Despite extensive searches involving Aruban authorities, FBI agents, Dutch military personnel, and volunteer teams, her remains have never been found.

Her disappearance generated intense international media attention, particularly in the United States. Van der Sloot and the Kalpoe brothers were arrested multiple times on suspicion of involvement, but all were released without charge due to insufficient evidence. Aruban prosecutors closed the case in December 2007, and Holloway was declared legally dead in January 2012 at her father's request.

Over the years, van der Sloot has made numerous conflicting statements about Holloway's fate, including claims that she died on the morning of her disappearance and that her body was disposed of by an associate. He later denied or retracted many of these statements. In 2023, after being extradited to the United States on extortion and wire‑fraud charges linked to the case, he pleaded guilty and confessed to killing Holloway by blunt‑force trauma. He subsequently returned to Peru to continue serving his sentence for the 2010 murder of Stephany Flores Ramírez.

== Background ==
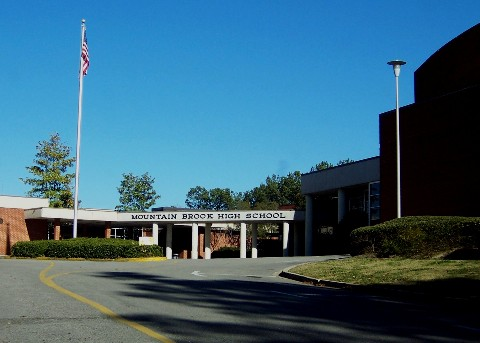
Mountain Brook High School, where Holloway graduated just before her trip to Aruba

Natalee Ann Holloway was born on October 21, 1986, in Memphis, Tennessee, the first of two children of Dave and Beth Holloway. Following her parents' divorce in 1993, Holloway and her younger brother, Matthew, were raised by their mother in Clinton, Mississippi. In 2000, following Beth's marriage to George "Jug" Twitty, an Alabama businessman, the family moved to Mountain Brook, Alabama, a suburb of Birmingham. Holloway graduated with honors from Mountain Brook High School in May 2005. She was a member of the National Honor Society and the school's dance squad and participated in other extracurricular activities. She was scheduled to attend the University of Alabama on a full scholarship, where she planned to pursue a pre-med track.

== Disappearance in Aruba ==
On May 26, 2005, Holloway and 124 fellow graduates of Mountain Brook High School arrived in Aruba for a five-day unofficial graduation trip. The students were accompanied by seven chaperones. According to teacher and chaperone Bob Plummer, the chaperones met with the students each day to check on them, while trip organizer Jodi Bearman said they were not expected to monitor the students' every movement. Aruban police commissioner Gerold Dompig, who led the investigation from mid-2005 until 2006, later described heavy partying and drinking among the students and said that Holloway drank throughout the day and sometimes began drinking in the morning. Two of Holloway's classmates, Liz Cain and Claire Fierman, said the drinking on the trip was "kind of excessive".

Holloway was last seen by her classmates around 1:30 a.m. on May 30, leaving the Oranjestad bar and nightclub Carlos'n Charlie's. She left in a car with 17-year-old Joran van der Sloot, a Dutch student living in Aruba, and brothers 21-year-old Deepak Kalpoe and 18-year-old Satish Kalpoe. Holloway was scheduled to fly home later that day but did not appear for the flight. Her packed luggage and passport were found in her room at the Holiday Inn. Aruban authorities searched the island and surrounding waters but did not find her.

== Investigation ==
=== Early investigation ===
Immediately after Holloway missed her flight, her mother and stepfather flew with friends to Aruba by private jet. Within four hours of arriving, the Twittys gave Aruban police the name and address of van der Sloot, with whom Holloway had left the nightclub. Beth said that the night manager at the Holiday Inn had given her van der Sloot's full name after reportedly recognizing him on a videotape. The Twittys and their friends went with two Aruban police officers to the van der Sloot residence to look for Holloway. Van der Sloot initially denied knowing Holloway's name but later gave an account corroborated by Deepak Kalpoe, who was at the residence. Van der Sloot said they had driven Holloway to the California Lighthouse area of Arashi Beach because she wanted to see sharks and later dropped her off at her hotel at around 2:00 a.m. According to van der Sloot, Holloway fell as she exited the car but refused his help. He also said that as he and Deepak drove away, Holloway was approached by a man wearing a black shirt similar to those worn by security guards.

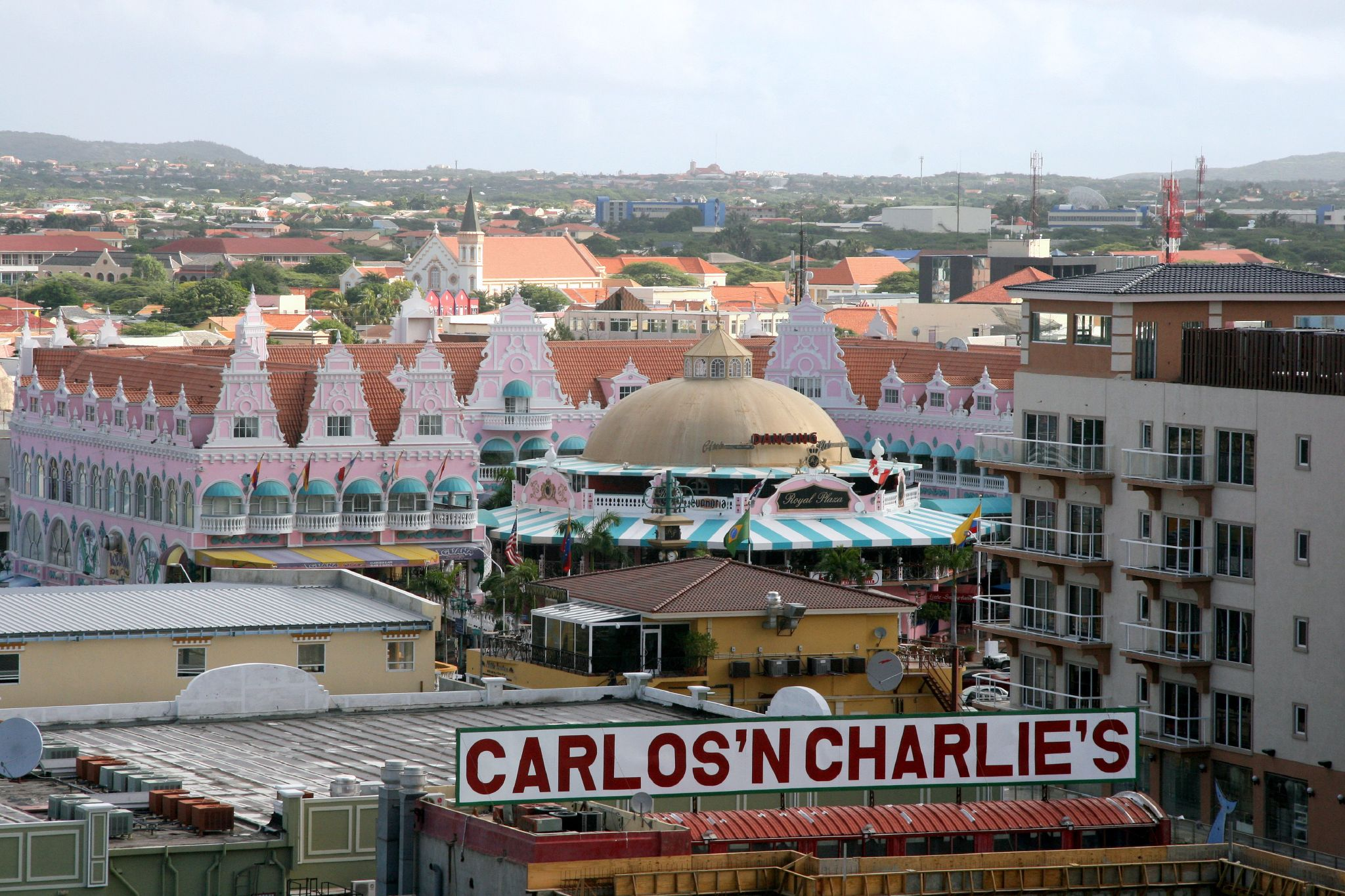
Carlos'n Charlie's in Oranjestad, Aruba. The restaurant was the last place Holloway was seen by her classmates.

Search efforts for Holloway began immediately, with hundreds of volunteers from Aruba and the United States participating. During the first days of the search, the Aruban government gave thousands of civil servants the day off to assist. Fifty Dutch marines searched the shoreline, while Aruban banks raised $20,000 and provided other support to volunteer search teams. Beth was initially provided accommodations at the Holiday Inn, where she stayed in the room her daughter had occupied, before moving to the presidential suite of the nearby Wyndham Hotel.

Reports indicated that Holloway did not appear on nighttime security camera footage of the Holiday Inn lobby, although Beth gave differing accounts of whether the cameras were operating that night. In an April 19, 2006, statement, she said the hotel's cameras had not been functioning, while in other statements and her book she indicated that they had been. Police Commissioner Jan van der Straaten, the initial head of the investigation until his retirement in 2005, said Holloway did not need to pass through the lobby to return to her room.

The search for physical evidence also produced false leads. A suspected blood sample taken from Deepak's car was tested and determined not to be blood.

United States law enforcement assisted Aruban authorities during the investigation. Secretary of State Condoleezza Rice said the U.S. was in constant contact with Aruban authorities, while another State Department official said that substantial U.S. resources were being provided as requested.

=== 2005 arrests of multiple suspects ===
On June 5, Aruban police detained Nick John and Abraham Jones, former security guards from the nearby Allegro Hotel (which was then closed for renovation) on suspicion of murder and kidnapping. Authorities have never officially disclosed the reason for their arrests, but, according to news accounts, statements made by van der Sloot and the Kalpoe brothers may have been a factor in their arrests. Reports also indicated that the two former guards were known for cruising hotels to pick up women, and at least one of them had a prior incident with law enforcement. John and Jones were released on June 13 without being charged.

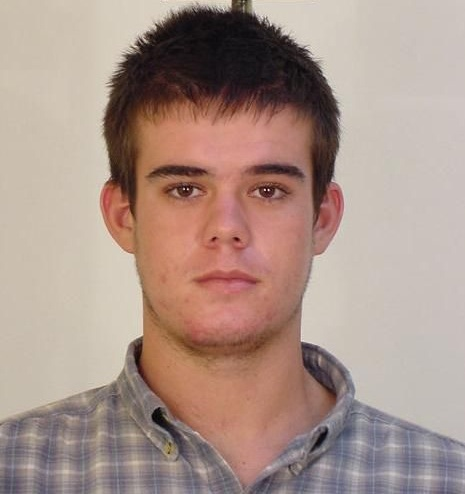
Mugshot of Joran van der Sloot, who was one of the suspects in Holloway's disappearance, June 2005

On June 9, van der Sloot and the Kalpoe brothers were arrested on suspicion of the kidnapping and murder of Holloway. Aruban law allows for investigators to make an arrest based on serious suspicion. In order to continue holding the suspect in custody, an increasing evidential burden must be met at periodic reviews. According to Dompig, the focus of the investigation centered on these three suspects from the "get-go". He stated that close observation of the three men began three days after Holloway was reported missing, and the investigation included surveillance, telephone wiretaps and even monitoring of their e-mail. Dompig indicated that pressure from Holloway's family caused police to prematurely stop their surveillance and detain the three suspects.

As the investigation continued, David Cruz — spokesman for the Aruban Minister of Justice — falsely indicated on June 11 that Holloway was dead and that authorities knew the location of her body. Cruz later retracted the statement, saying he was a victim of a "misinformation campaign". That evening, Dompig alleged to the Associated Press that one of the detained young men admitted "something bad happened" to Holloway after the suspects took her to the beach and that the suspect was leading police to the scene. The next morning, prosecution spokeswoman Vivian van der Biezen refused to confirm or deny the allegation, simply stating that the investigation was at a "very crucial, very important moment".

On June 17, a sixth person later identified as disc jockey Steve Gregory Croes was also arrested. Van der Straaten told the media that "Croes was detained based on information from one of the other three detainees." On June 22, Aruban police detained van der Sloot's father, Paulus van der Sloot, for questioning; he was arrested that same day. Both Paulus and Croes were ordered to be released on June 26.

During this period, the suspects who had been detained changed their stories. All three indicated that van der Sloot and Holloway were dropped off at the beach near the Marriott Hotel. Van der Sloot stated that he did not harm Holloway but left her on the beach. According to Satish's attorney, David Kock, van der Sloot called Deepak to tell the latter that he was walking home and sent him a text message forty minutes later. At some time during the interrogation, van der Sloot detailed a third account that he was dropped off at home and Holloway was driven off by the Kalpoe brothers. Dompig discounted the story, stating:

This latest story [came about] when [Van der Sloot] saw [that] the other guys, the Kalpoes, were kind of finger-pointing in his direction, and he wanted to screw them also, by saying he was dropped off. But that story doesn't check out at all. He just wanted to screw Deepak. They had great arguments about this in front of the judge. Because their stories didn't match. This girl, she was from Alabama, she's not going to stay in the car with two black kids. We believe the second story, that they were dropped off by the Marriott.

Following hearings before a judge, the Kalpoe brothers were released on Monday, July 4, but van der Sloot was detained for an additional sixty days.

=== Continued search, rearrests and releases ===
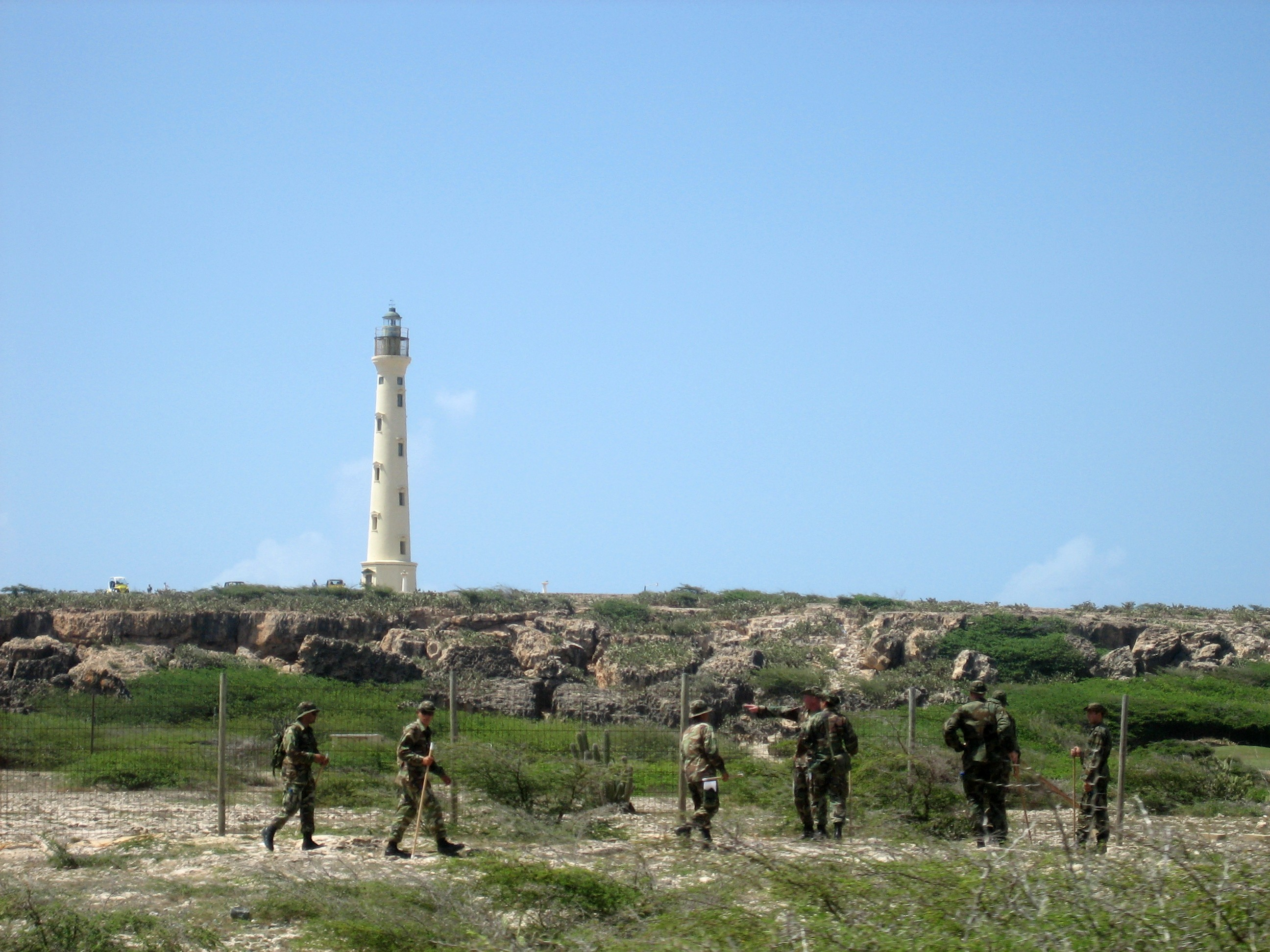
Dutch Marines searching for Holloway's remains near the California Lighthouse in Aruba

On July 4, the Royal Netherlands Air Force deployed three F-16 aircraft equipped with infrared sensors to aid in the search, but the results came up empty. In March 2006 it was reported that satellite photos were being compared with photographs taken more recently (presumably from the F-16s) in an attempt to find unexpected shifts of ground that might be Holloway's grave.

After a local gardener came forward with information, a small pond near the Aruba Racquet Club, close to the Marriott Hotel beach, was partly drained between July 27 and 30, 2005. According to Jug Twitty, the gardener claimed to have seen van der Sloot attempting to hide his face as he drove into the Racquet Club with the Kalpoe brothers on the very early morning of May 30 between 2:30 a.m. and 3:00 a.m. Nancy Grace described the gardener as "the man whose testimony cracks the case wide open". Another person, "the jogger", claimed to have seen men burying a blonde-haired woman in a landfill during the afternoon of May 30. The police had searched the landfill in the days following Holloway's disappearance. After the jogger's statements, the landfill was searched three more times; the FBI used cadaver dogs to assist in the recovery operation. The searches were fruitless.

Holloway's family initially offered $175,000 and donors offered $50,000 for her safe return. Two months after her disappearance, the reward was increased from $200,000 to $1,000,000, with a $100,000 reward for information leading to the location of her remains. In August 2005, the reward for information leading to Natalee's remains was increased from $100,000 to $250,000.

The FBI announced that Aruban authorities had provided its agency with documents, suspect interviews and other evidence. Investigators found a piece of duct tape with strands of blond hair attached to it; the samples were tested at a Dutch lab. A group from the Aruban police and prosecutor's office then traveled to the FBI laboratory at Quantico, Virginia, to consult with American investigators. The hair samples were then tested a second time. The FBI announced that the hair samples did not belong to Holloway.

The Kalpoe brothers were rearrested on August 26 along with another new suspect, 21-year-old Freddy Arambatzis. Arambatzis' lawyer said that his client was suspected of taking photographs of an underage girl and having inappropriate physical contact with said girl. This incident allegedly occurred before the Holloway disappearance. Arambatzis' friends van der Sloot and the Kalpoe brothers were supposedly involved in the incident. Van der Sloot's mother, Anita van der Sloot, stated, "It's a desperate attempt to get the boys to talk. But there is nothing to talk about." While no public explanation was then made for the Kalpoe rearrests, Dompig later said that it was an unsuccessful attempt to pressure the brothers into confessing.

On September 3, the four detained suspects were released by a judge despite the attempts of the prosecution to keep them in custody. The suspects were released on the condition that they remain available to police. On September 14, all restrictions on the suspects were removed by the Combined Appeals Court of the Netherlands Antilles and Aruba.

In the months following his release, van der Sloot gave several interviews that explained his version of events. The most notable interview was broadcast on Fox News over three nights in March 2006. During the interview, van der Sloot indicated that Holloway wanted to have sex with him, but he did not because he did not have a condom. He stated that Holloway wanted them to stay on the beach, but that he had to go to school in the morning. According to van der Sloot, he was picked up by Satish at about 3:00 a.m. and left Holloway sitting on the beach. In August 2005, David Kock, Satish's attorney, stated that his client had gone to sleep and had not returned to drive van der Sloot home. Van der Sloot stated that he was somewhat ashamed to have left a young woman alone on the beach, albeit by her own request, and related that he was not truthful at first because he was convinced that Holloway would soon turn up.

In January 2006, the FBI and Aruban authorities interviewed—or in some cases, re-interviewed—several of Holloway's classmates in Alabama. On January 17, Aruban police searched for Holloway's body in sand dunes on the northwest coast of Aruba, as well as areas close by the Marriott Hotel beach. Additional searches took place in March and April 2006, without result.

Shortly before leaving the case, Dompig gave an interview to CBS News in which he stated that he believed Holloway was not murdered but probably died from alcohol or drug poisoning and that someone later hid her body. He also stated that Aruba had spent about $3 million on the investigation, which was about 40% of the police operational budget. Dompig indicated that there was evidence that pointed to possession (though not necessarily use) of illicit drugs by Holloway. Members of Holloway's family denied that she used drugs.

On April 11, 2006, Holloway's father published a book—co-authored with R. Stephanie Good and Larry Garrison—called Aruba: The Tragic Untold Story of Natalee Holloway and Corruption in Paradise, that recounted the search for his daughter.

=== 2006 arrests of new suspects; Dutch investigation takeover ===
On April 15, 2006, Geoffrey van Cromvoirt was arrested by Aruban authorities on suspicion of criminal offenses related to dealing in narcotics which, according to the prosecutor, might have been related to the disappearance of Holloway. At his first court appearance, his detention was extended by eight days. Van Cromvoirt was released, however, on April 25. In addition, another individual with initials "A.B." was arrested on April 22, but was released the same day.

On May 17, Guido Wever, the son of a former Aruban politician, was detained in the Netherlands on suspicion of assisting in the abducting, battering and killing of Holloway. Wever was questioned for six days in Utrecht. Aruban prosecutors initially sought his transfer to the island, but he was instead released by agreement between the prosecutor and Wever's attorney.

At Aruba's request, the Netherlands took over the investigation. Following receipt of extensive case documentation in Rotterdam, a team of the Dutch National Police started work on the case in September. On April 16, 2007, a combined Aruban–Dutch team began pursuing the investigation in Aruba.

=== Book, search and inspection ===
A book by van der Sloot and reporter Zvezdana Vukojevic, De zaak Natalee Holloway (The Case of Natalee Holloway) was published in Dutch in April 2007. In the book, van der Sloot gives his perspective of the night Holloway disappeared and the media frenzy that followed. He admits to and apologizes for his initial lies but maintains his innocence.

On April 27, a new search involving approximately twenty investigators was launched at the van der Sloot family residence in Aruba. Dutch authorities searched the yard and surrounding area, using shovels and thin metal rods to penetrate the dirt. Prosecution spokeswoman Van der Biezen stated, "The investigation has never stopped and the Dutch authorities are completely reviewing the case for new indications." A statement from the prosecutor's office related, "The team has indications that justify a more thorough search." Investigators did not comment on what prompted the new search, except that it was not related to van der Sloot's book. According to Paulus van der Sloot, "nothing suspicious" was found, and all that was seized were diary entries of him and his wife, and his personal computer—which was subsequently returned. According to Jossy Mansur, managing editor of Aruba's Diario newspaper, investigators were following up on statements made during early suspect interrogations regarding communications between the Kalpoe brothers and van der Sloot. He also said investigators could be seen examining a laptop at the house.

On May 12, the Kalpoe family residence was searched by the authorities. The two brothers were detained for about an hour upon objecting to the entry by police but were released when they left. According to Kock, the brothers objected to the search because officials did not show them an order justifying the intrusion. A statement from Van der Biezen did not mention what, if anything, officials were searching for, but indicated nothing was removed from the home. A subsequent statement from the Aruban prosecutor's office indicated that the purpose of the visit was to "get a better image of the place or circumstances where an offense may have been committed and to understand the chain of events leading to the offense."

=== 2007 rearrests and re-releases ===
Citing what was described as newly discovered evidence, Aruban investigators rearrested van der Sloot and the Kalpoe brothers on November 21, 2007, on suspicion of involvement in "manslaughter and causing serious bodily harm that resulted in the death of Holloway." Van der Sloot was detained by Dutch authorities in the Netherlands, while the Kalpoe brothers were detained in Aruba. Van der Sloot was returned to Aruba, where he was incarcerated.

Soon after, Dave Holloway announced a new search for his daughter that probed the sea beyond the original 330-foot (100 m) depths in which earlier searches had taken place. That search involved a vessel called the Persistence and was abandoned due to lack of funds at the end of February 2008, when nothing of significance was found.

On November 30, a judge ordered the release of the Kalpoe brothers. Despite attempts by the prosecution to extend their detention, the brothers were released on the following day. The prosecution appealed their release, which was denied on December 5, with the court writing, "Notwithstanding expensive and lengthy investigations on her disappearance and on people who could be involved, the file against the suspect does not contain direct indications that Natalee passed away due to a violent crime." Van der Sloot was released without charge on December 7 due to lack of evidence implicating him as well as a lack of evidence that Holloway died as the result of a violent crime. The prosecution indicated it would not appeal.

On December 18, prosecutor Hans Mos officially declared the case closed, and that no charges would be filed due to lack of evidence. The prosecution indicated a continuing interest in van der Sloot and the Kalpoe brothers (though they legally ceased to be suspects) and alleged that one of the three, in a chatroom message, had stated that Holloway was dead. This was hotly contested by Deepak's attorney, who stated that the prosecution, in translating from Papiamento to Dutch, had misconstrued a reference to a teacher who had drowned as one to Holloway. Attorney Ronald Wix also stated, "Unless [Mos] finds a body in the bathroom of one of these kids, there's no way in hell they can arrest them anymore."

=== Dutch television programme ===
On January 31, 2008, Dutch crime reporter Peter R. de Vries claimed that he had solved the Holloway case. De Vries stated that he would tell all on a special program on Dutch television on February 3. On February 1, Dutch media reported that van der Sloot made a confession regarding Holloway's disappearance. Later that day, van der Sloot stated that he was telling the individual what he wanted to hear, and denied any involvement in her disappearance. That same day, the Aruba prosecutor's office announced the reopening of the case.

The broadcast, aired on February 3, 2008, included excerpts from footage recorded from hidden cameras and microphones in the vehicle of Patrick van der Eem, a Dutch businessman and ex-convict who gained van der Sloot's confidence. Van der Sloot was seen smoking marijuana and stating that he was with Holloway when she began convulsively shaking, then became unresponsive. Van der Sloot stated that he attempted to revive her, without success. He said that he called a friend, who told van der Sloot to go home and who disposed of the body. An individual reputed to be this friend, identified in the broadcast as Daury, denied van der Sloot's account, indicating that he was then in Rotterdam at school.

The Aruban prosecutor's office attempted to obtain an arrest warrant for van der Sloot based on the tapes; however, a judge denied the request. The prosecutor appealed the denial, but the appeal failed on February 14. The appeals court held that the statements on the tape were inconsistent with evidence in the case and were insufficient to hold van der Sloot. On February 8, van der Sloot met with Aruban investigators in the Netherlands and denied that what he said on the tape was true, stating that he was under the influence of marijuana at the time. Van der Sloot indicated that he still maintains that he left Holloway behind on the beach.

In March 2008, news reports indicated that van der Eem was secretly taped after giving an interview for Aruban television. Van der Eem, under the impression that cameras had been turned off, disclosed that he had been a friend of van der Sloot for years (contradicting his statement on De Vries' show that he had met van der Sloot in 2007), that he expected to become a millionaire through his involvement in the Holloway case, and that he knew the person who supposedly disposed of Holloway's body—and that van der Sloot had asked him for two thousand euros to buy the man's silence. According to Dutch news service ANP, van der Eem, who had already signed a book deal, "was furious" after learning of the taping and "threatened" the interviewer, who sought legal advice. Van der Eem's book Overboord (Overboard), co-written with E.E. Byars, was released (in Dutch) on June 25.

The De Vries broadcast was discussed in a seminar by Dutch legal psychologist Willem Albert Wagenaar, who indicated that the statements did not constitute a confession. Wagenaar criticized De Vries for broadcasting the material, stating that the broadcast made it harder to obtain a conviction, and had De Vries turned over the material to the authorities without broadcasting it, they would have held "all the trumps" in questioning van der Sloot. Wagenaar opined that not only was the case not solved, it was not even clear that a crime had been committed. Professor Crisje Brants, in the same seminar, also criticized De Vries' methods.

On November 24, Fox News aired an interview with van der Sloot in which he alleged that he sold Holloway into sexual slavery, receiving money both when Holloway was taken, and later on to keep quiet. Van der Sloot also alleged that his father paid off two police officers who had learned that Holloway was taken to Venezuela. Van der Sloot later retracted the statements made in the interview. Fox News also aired part of an audio recording provided by van der Sloot, which he alleged is a phone conversation between him and his father, in which the father displays knowledge of his son's purported involvement in human trafficking. According to Mos, this voice heard on the recording is not that of Paulus van der Sloot—the Dutch newspaper De Telegraaf reported that the "father's" voice is almost certainly that of Joran van der Sloot himself, trying to speak in a lower tone. Paulus died of a heart attack on February 10, 2010.

On March 20, 2009, Dave Holloway transported a search dog to Aruba to search a small reservoir in the northern part of the island. The reservoir was previously identified by a supposed witness as a possible location of Natalee's remains. Aruban authorities indicated that they had no new information in the case, but that Holloway had been given permission to conduct the search.

On February 23, 2010, it was reported that van der Sloot had stated in an interview (first offered to RTL Group in 2009) that he had disposed of Holloway's body in a marsh on Aruba. New chief prosecutor Peter Blanken indicated that authorities had investigated the latest story, and had dismissed it. Blanken stated that the "locations, names, and times he gave just did not make sense."

In March 2010, underwater searches were conducted by Aruban authorities after an American couple reported that they were snorkeling when they photographed what they thought might be human skeletal remains, possibly those of Holloway. Aruban authorities sent divers to investigate, but no remains were ever recovered.

=== Van der Sloot's extortion of Holloway family ===
On March 29, 2010, van der Sloot contacted John Q. Kelly, Beth Twitty's legal representative, with an offer to reveal the location of Holloway's body and the circumstances surrounding her death, if he were given advance of US$25,000 against a total of $250,000. After Kelly notified the FBI, they arranged to proceed with the transaction. On May 10, van der Sloot had a $15,000 wire transferred to his account in the Netherlands, following the receipt of $10,000 in cash that was videotaped by undercover investigators in Aruba. Authorities stated that the information that he provided in return was false because the house in which he said Holloway's body was located had not yet been built at the time of her disappearance. On June 3, van der Sloot was charged in the U.S. District Court of Northern Alabama with extortion and wire fraud. U.S. Attorney Joyce White Vance obtained an arrest warrant and transmitted it to Interpol. On June 30, van der Sloot was indicted on the charges.

At the request of the U.S. Justice Department, authorities conducted a June 4 raid and confiscated items from two homes in the Netherlands. One of the homes belonged to reporter Jaap Amesz, who had previously interviewed van der Sloot and claimed knowledge of his criminal activities. Aruban investigators used information gathered from the extortion case to launch a new search at a beach, but no new evidence was found. Dave Holloway returned to Aruba on June 14 to pursue possible new clues.

=== Van der Sloot's murder of Stephany Flores Ramirez in Peru ===
On May 30, 2010 — five years to the day after Holloway's disappearance — Stephany Flores Ramírez, a 21-year-old business student, was reported missing in Lima, Peru. She was found dead three days later in a hotel room registered in van der Sloot's name. On June 3, van der Sloot was arrested in Chile on a murder charge, and he was extradited to Peru the next day. On June 7, Peruvian authorities said that van der Sloot confessed to killing Flores after he lost his temper because she accessed his laptop without permission and found information linking him to Holloway. Police chief César Guardia related that van der Sloot told Peruvian police that he knew where Holloway's body was and offered to help Aruban authorities find it. However, Guardia stated that the interrogation was limited to their case in Peru, and that questions about Holloway's disappearance were avoided. On June 11, van der Sloot was charged in Lima Superior Court with first-degree murder and robbery. On June 15, Aruban and Peruvian authorities announced an agreement to cooperate and allow investigators from Aruba to interview van der Sloot at Miguel Castro Castro prison in Peru. In a September 2010 interview from the prison, van der Sloot reportedly admitted to the extortion plot, stating: "I wanted to get back at Natalee's family—her parents have been making my life tough for five years." On January 11, 2012, van der Sloot pleaded guilty to murdering Flores and was sentenced to 28 years in prison.

=== Declaration of death ===
In June 2011 (six years after Natalee's disappearance), Dave Holloway filed a petition with the Alabama courts to have his daughter declared legally dead. The papers were served on his ex-wife Beth Twitty, who announced her intention to oppose the petition. A hearing was held on September 23, 2011, at which time Probate Judge Alan King ruled that Dave Holloway had met the requirements for a legal presumption of death. On January 12, 2012, a second hearing was held, after which Judge King signed the order declaring Natalee Holloway to be dead.

=== Unrelated bone discovery, contested Oxygen documentary ===
On November 12, 2010, tourists found a jawbone on an Aruban beach near the Phoenix Hotel and Bubali Swamp. Preliminary examination by a forensic expert determined that the bone was from a young woman. A part of the bone was sent to The Hague for testing by the Netherlands Forensic Institute. On November 23, 2010, Aruba Solicitor-General Taco Stein announced that based on dental records, the jawbone was not of Holloway, and it was not even possible to determine whether it had come from a man or woman.

In 2016, Dave Holloway hired a private investigator, T.J. Ward, to once more go through all evidence and information related to the disappearance of his daughter. This led to an informant, Gabriel, who claimed to have been a roommate of one of van der Sloot's closest friends, American John Ludwick, in 2005. Gabriel claimed that Ludwick was told what became of Natalee. In an interview with the Oxygen television channel, Gabriel gave a detailed description of what happened on the night of Natalee's disappearance. Oxygen created a new documentary series on Natalee's disappearance that aired on August 19, 2017. Using Gabriel's information, the investigator had found what appeared to be human bones. On October 3, 2017, DNA testing concluded that one piece of bone was human but did not belong to Natalee.

On the show, Ludwick claimed to have helped van der Sloot dig up, smash and cremate Holloway's bones in 2010. In February 2018, Holloway's mother sued the producers, alleging this and other claims are fictional and harmfully lurid, and that she was misled into providing a DNA sample for comparison without being made aware of plans for a show. In March 2018, Ludwick was stabbed to death by a woman he tried to kidnap.

=== 2023 extradition of Joran van der Sloot to the United States ===
On June 8, 2023, Joran van der Sloot was officially extradited from Peru, where he was serving his 28-year sentence for the 2010 murder of Stephany Flores Ramírez, to the United States, landing at Shuttlesworth Airport in Birmingham, Alabama just before 2:30 p.m. After arriving in Birmingham, he was taken into U.S. custody and transported to the Hoover City Jail. On June 9, he was arraigned in the federal court in Birmingham on one count of extortion and one count of wire fraud against Holloway's mother. He pleaded not guilty to each charge.

On October 18, 2023, van der Sloot confessed in a proffer letter to killing Holloway. He wrote that he kicked and bludgeoned her with a cinder block after she refused his sexual advances, and disposed of her body in the ocean.

On March 17, 2026, Holloway's mother filed a complaint against van der Sloot with the Dutch Public Prosecutor's Office, hoping that the Netherlands would initiate prosecution that could lead to van der Sloot's conviction.

== Investigation criticism ==
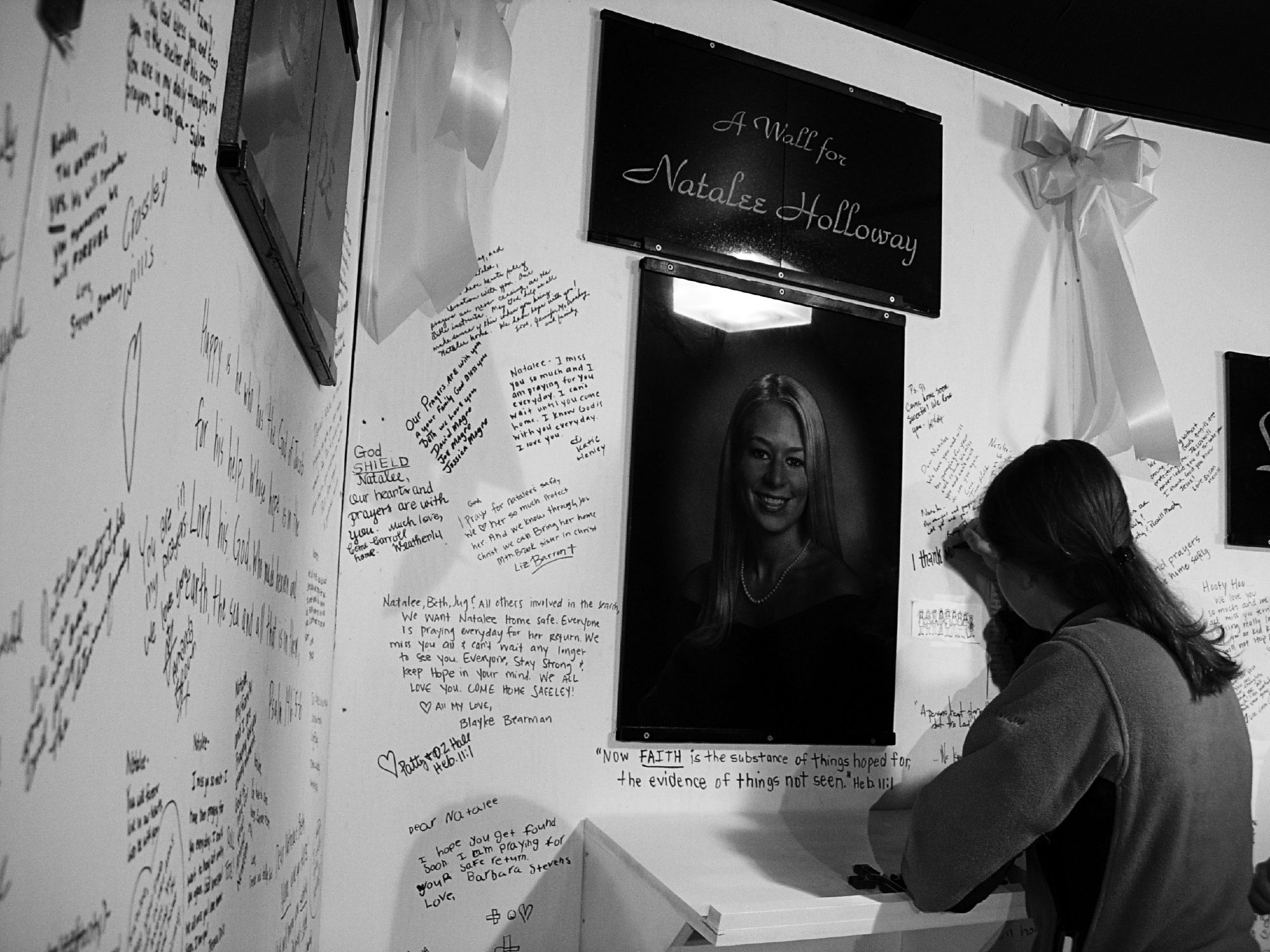
A young woman leaves a message on a prayer wall erected in support and memory of Holloway

The Twittys and their supporters criticized a perceived lack of progress by Aruban police. The Twittys' own actions in Aruba were also criticized, and the Twittys were accused of actively stifling any evidence that might impugn Holloway's character by asking her fellow students to remain silent about the case and using their access to the media to push their own version of events. The Twittys denied this.

In televised interviews and in a book, Beth Twitty alleged that van der Sloot and the Kalpoe brothers knew more about Holloway's disappearance than they have told authorities and that at least one of them sexually assaulted or raped her daughter. On July 5, 2005, following the initial release of the Kalpoes, Twitty alleged, "Two suspects were released yesterday who were involved in a violent crime against my daughter," and referred to the Kalpoes as "criminals". A demonstration involving about two hundred Arubans took place that evening outside the Oranjestad courthouse. The protesters were angry over Twitty's remarks, with signs reading, "Innocent until proven guilty" and, "Respect our Dutch laws or go home." Satish Kalpoe's attorney threatened legal action and described Twitty's allegations as "prejudicial, inflammatory, libelous, and totally outrageous." On July 8, 2005, Twitty read a statement that said her remarks were fuelled by "despair and frustration" and that she "apologize[d] to the Aruban people and to the Aruban authorities if I or my family offended you in any way."

In 2007, Twitty released her own book Loving Natalee: A Mother's Testament of Hope and Faith. That same year Twitty appeared on Nancy Grace and said:

What we want is, we want justice. And you know—and we have to recognize the fact that, you know, this crime has been committed on the island of Aruba, and we know the perpetrators. We know it's these suspects, Deepak and Satish Kalpoe and Joran Van Der Sloot. And you know, we just have to, though, keep going, Nancy, because the only way we will get justice for Natalee is if we do keep going. I mean, if we give up, absolutely nothing will happen. Nothing.

— Beth Holloway

Following the airing of the De Vries programme on Dutch television, Twitty adhered to the position that the tapes represented the way events transpired and told the New York Post that she believed her daughter might still be alive if van der Sloot had called for help. She contended that van der Sloot had dumped Holloway's body, possibly alive, into the Caribbean sea. Twitty also alleged that the person van der Sloot supposedly called that evening was his father, Paulus, who, according to Twitty, "orchestrated what to do next". Holloway's parents alleged that Van der Sloot was receiving "special legal favors". After the court decision not to rearrest Van der Sloot was affirmed, Twitty stated, "I think that what I do take comfort in, his life is a living hell," later adding, "I'd be good with a Midnight Express prison anywhere for Joran."

In response to her daughter's disappearance, Twitty founded the International Safe Travels Foundation, a non-profit organization designed "to inform and educate the public to help them travel more safely as they travel internationally." In May 2010, she announced that the Natalee Holloway Resource Center would open at the National Museum of Crime & Punishment. Located in Washington, D.C., the center opened on June 8 to aid families of missing people.

Holloway's family initially discouraged a travel boycott of Aruba, but this changed by September 2005. Twitty urged that people not travel to Aruba and other Dutch territories because of what she stated were tourist safety issues. In a November 8, 2005, news conference, Governor Bob Riley and the Holloways urged Alabamians and others to boycott Aruba. Riley also wrote to other United States governors seeking their support—the governors of Georgia and Arkansas eventually joined in the call for a boycott. Philadelphia's city council voted to ask the Pennsylvania Governor Ed Rendell to call for a boycott. Rendell did not do so, and no federal support was given.

The boycott was supported by some of Alabama's Congressional delegation, including both senators and Representative Spencer Bachus (R-AL), who represents Mountain Brook. Senator Richard Shelby (R-AL) voiced his support for the boycott in a letter to the American Society of Travel Agents. Shelby stated, "For the safety, security and well-being of our citizens, I do not believe that we can trust that we will be protected while in Aruba." Prime Minister Oduber stated that Aruban investigators have done their best to solve the case, and responded to the call for boycott, "This is a preposterous and irresponsible act. We are not guerillas. We are not terrorists. We don't pose a threat to the United States, nor to Alabama."

Members of the Aruba Hotel and Tourism Association, the Aruba Tourism Authority, the Aruba Hospitality and Security Foundation, the Aruban Chamber of Commerce and government figures, including Public Relations Representative Ruben Trapenberg, formed an "Aruba Strategic Communications Task Force" to respond collectively to what they perceived to be unfounded or negative portrayals of the island. The group issued press releases and sent representatives to appear in news media. They joined the Aruban government in opposing the calls for a boycott of the island.

=== Skeeters tape and Dr. Phil; lawsuits ===
On September 15, 2005, the Dr. Phil television show showed parts of a hidden camera interview with Deepak Kalpoe in which he seemingly affirmed a suggestion that Holloway had sex with all three men. The taping had been instigated by Jamie Skeeters, a private investigator. When the tape was broadcast, news reports indicated an expectation of a rearrest, which Dompig termed a "strong possibility" if the tapes were legitimate.

Aruban police subsequently provided a fuller version of the relevant part of the tape in which Kalpoe's response differed from the Dr. Phil version, apparently due to editing that may have altered the meaning of what was said. An unofficial Aruban-affiliated spokesperson and commentator on the case said that the uncut videotape showed that Kalpoe had shaken his head and said, "No, she didn't", thereby denying that Holloway had sex with him and the other two men. According to an MSNBC report, the crucial words are inaudible, and presenter Rita Cosby questioned if it could be substantiated that Kalpoe had ever made the statements attributed to him in the Dr. Phil version of the recording.

In December 2006, the Kalpoes filed a slander and libel suit against Skeeters (who died in January 2007) and Dr. Phil in Los Angeles, California. Holloway's parents responded by filing a wrongful death lawsuit against the Kalpoes in the same venue. The wrongful death suit was dismissed for lack of personal jurisdiction on June 1, 2007; the libel and slander case was initially set for trial on October 12, 2011 but was later set for April 2015. An earlier suit had been filed in New York City by Holloway's parents against Joran and Paulus van der Sloot and served on them on a visit to New York. The case had been dismissed in August 2006 as filed in an inconvenient forum.

On November 10, 2005, Paulus van der Sloot won an unjust detention action against the Aruban government, clearing him as a suspect and allowing him to retain his government contract. The elder van der Sloot then brought a second action, seeking monetary damages for himself and his family because of his false arrest. The action was initially successful, but the award of damages was reversed on appeal.

=== Amigoe article ===
The Amigoe newspaper reported on interviews with Julia Renfro and Dompig in which they said that Aruban authorities had been systematically obstructed in their investigation by U.S. officials. They also said that within a day of Holloway's being reported missing, a medjet, unauthorized by Aruban authorities, had arrived on Aruba and had remained for several days for the purpose of covertly taking Holloway off the island without notifying local authorities. Renfro, an American-born editor of an English-language daily, Aruba Today, who at the time of Holloway's disappearance had become close friends with Twitty, also said she and Twitty received a phone call from an unknown woman on June 2, 2005, asking for money in return for information about Holloway's location, and asserting that Holloway was unwilling to return to her mother. According to Renfro, she and another American went to a drug house where Holloway supposedly was, bringing money, but found that Jug Twitty had already been to the area, spreading "a lot of uproar and panic in the direct vicinity", and nothing could be accomplished. The Twittys disputed Renfro's accounts, with Beth Twitty describing Renfro as "a witch".

=== Adaptations ===
On April 19, 2009, LMN aired Natalee Holloway, a television film based on Twitty's book Loving Natalee. Starring Tracy Pollan as Beth Twitty, Grant Show as Jug Twitty, Amy Gumenick as Holloway, and Jacques Strydom as van der Sloot, the film retells events leading up to the night of Holloway's disappearance in 2005 and the ensuing investigation in the aftermath. It was shot in South Africa.

The movie stages re-creations of various scenarios based on the testimony of key players and suspects, including van der Sloot. The broadcast of the film attracted 3.2 million viewers, garnering the highest television ratings in the network's eleven year history. Although it set ratings records for Lifetime, the movie received mixed reviews from critics. Alec Harvey of The Birmingham News called the movie "sloppy and uneven, a forgettable look at the tragedy that consumed the nation's attention for months." However, Jake Meaney of PopMatters found the film surprisingly "calm and levelheaded", and praised Pollan's portrayal of Holloway's mother.

A follow-up film, Justice for Natalee Holloway, aired in mid-2011 on LMN. This film picks up in 2010, on the five-year anniversary of Holloway's disappearance.

In 2026, Netflix produced a documentary series Taken: Natalee Holloway, directed by Dani Sloane and Matthew Galkin.

== Media coverage ==
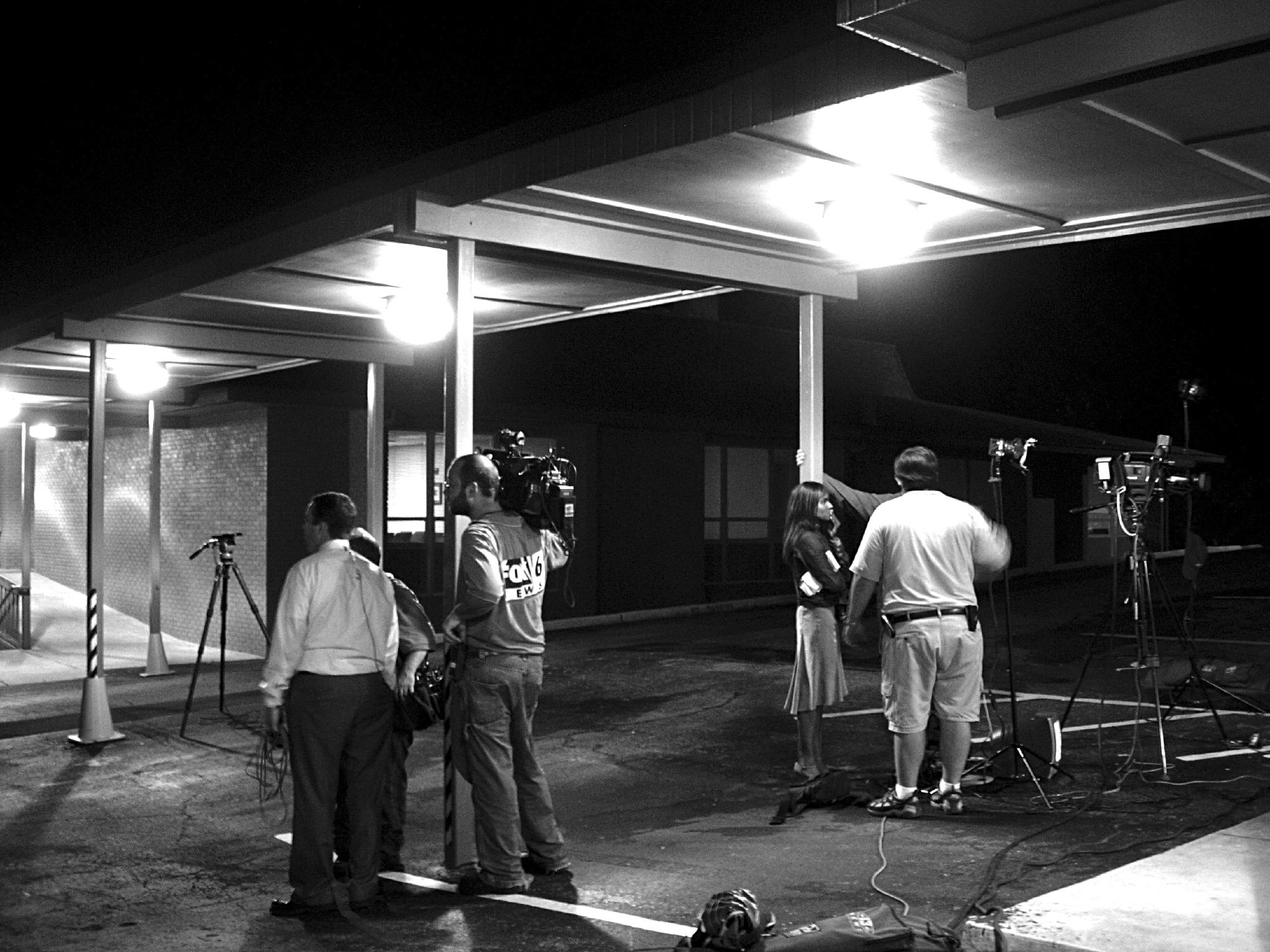
News crews covering the story 11 days after Holloway's disappearance, June 10, 2005

U.S. television networks devoted substantial air time to the search for Holloway, the investigation of her disappearance, and rumors surrounding the case. Greta Van Susteren, host of Fox News' On the Record, and Nancy Grace, on her eponymous Headline News program, were among the most prominent television personalities to devote time to the incident. Van Susteren's almost continuous coverage of the story garnered On the Record its best ratings to date, while Grace's show became the cornerstone of the new "Headline Prime" block on Headline News, which ran two episodes (a live show and a repeat) every night during primetime. As the case wore on, much of the attention was given to Beth Twitty and her statements. Aruban government spokesman Ruben Trapenberg stated, "The case is under a microscope, and the world is watching."

The saturation of coverage triggered a backlash among some critics who argued that such extensive media attention validated the "missing white woman syndrome" theory, which argues that missing person cases involving white women and girls receive disproportionately more attention in the media compared with cases involving white males or people of color. CNN ran a segment criticizing the amount of coverage their competitors gave to the story despite what they characterized as a lack of new items to report, with CNN news anchor Anderson Cooper calling the coverage "downright ridiculous".

Early in the case, political commentator and columnist Arianna Huffington wrote, "If you were to get your news only from television, you'd think the top issue facing our country right now is an 18-year-old girl named Natalee who went missing in Aruba. Every time one of these stories comes up, like, say, Michael Jackson, when it's finally over I think, what a relief, now we can get back to real news. But we never do." In March 2008, El Diario commented, "But if doubts persist about cases involving missing Latinos, there are reasons why. These cases rarely receive the attention and resources we see given to other missing persons. The English language media, for example, appear to be focused on the stories of missing white women, such as with the disappearance of Natalee Holloway in Aruba. Cases of missing Latino and African-American women often remain faceless, if and when they are even covered."

CBS senior journalist Danna Walker stated, "There is criticism that it is only a story because she is a pretty blonde—and white—and it is criticism that journalists are taking to heart and looking elsewhere for other stories. But it is a big story because it is an American girl who went off on an adventure and didn't come back. It is a huge mystery; it is something people can identify with." Good Morning America anchor Chris Cuomo was unapologetic of his program's extensive coverage of the Holloway case, stating: "I don't believe it's my role to judge what people want to watch … If they say, 'I want to know what happened to this girl' … I want to help them find out."

Holloway's family, however, took the opposite approach and criticized the lessening of coverage of her disappearance due to a shift in news priority when Hurricane Katrina struck on August 23, 2005. The saturation coverage of Holloway's disappearance would ultimately be eclipsed by the hurricane. Beth Twitty and Dave Holloway alleged that Aruba took advantage of the extensive coverage of Hurricane Katrina to release the suspects; however, the deadline for judicial review of van der Sloot's detention was set long before Katrina.

Dave Holloway stated in his book:

Hurricane Katrina had left the door open for the boys to be sent on their way with little publicity and few restrictions because it took the world's focus off of Natalee, but only for a brief time. The huge amount of publicity had waned and, during that time of quiet for us, Joran and the Kalpoe brothers were sent home ... All of the news shows that had followed our every move only a day before had now become fixated on the next big ratings grabber: the victims of Hurricane Katrina.

== See also ==
- List of people who disappeared mysteriously (2000–present)
