= Kevin Sweeney case =

Kevin Sweeney is a British businessman convicted in 2001 in the Netherlands for the murder of his wife, Suzanne Davies, by arson on 17 July 1995. The prosecution offered no motive for the alleged crime and Suzanne's life insurance policies were in trust for the children.

Sweeney was acquitted after a 1996 trial, but the prosecution appealed the verdict (the Dutch legal system permits appeal of acquittals). In May 2008 Sweeney made an application to the Dutch Supreme Court for a re-trial. On 22 August 2008 he was released from jail after serving 7 and a half years of the original sentence of 13 and a half. In the Netherlands, such early release is normal for prisoners who have shown good behaviour and are not considered to be a danger to society.

== Case ==
Kevin Sweeney and Suzanne Davies lived with their three children and had recently bought a new house at Steensel, near Eindhoven in the Netherlands. On Monday, 17 July 1995, Sweeney had left Steensel at around 2 a.m. because one of his daughters, in the care of a nurse at the Sweeney's other home, was seriously ill. At about a quarter to three, the housekeeper and a policeman walked around the house in response to a report of an electrical failure by the recently installed burglar alarm. They noticed nothing, no one answered the door, and they were unable to enter the house since the doors were bolted from the inside. At 3:30 a.m., smoke and later fire was noticed coming from an upstairs bedroom window by neighbours and passers by. At 4:00 a.m., Sweeney arrived at his other home about 180 km from Steensel. At the same time, the fire brigade, police and ambulance arrived in Steensel. Davies was found in the dressing room next to her bedroom. The bedroom was full of smoke and a small fire was burning at the foot of the bed. She showed signs of life, but resuscitation attempts failed. Half an hour later she was pronounced dead. The cause of death was carbon monoxide poisoning.

== Prosecution ==
Kevin Sweeney was charged with murdering Suzanne Davies by setting fire to her bedroom in Steensel. He was cleared by the court in Den Bosch of these charges on 24 October 1996. The Public Prosecutor appealed on 6 November 1996, but stated during proceedings on 3 November 1997 that there remained much still to be investigated. The case was adjourned. Fire investigator Peter Reijman made seven attempts at reconstructions of the fire, costing 6 million Dutch guilders. On 6 February 2001, three years and three months later, the appeal continued. The court in Den Bosch found Sweeney guilty and sentenced him to 13 years in prison on 20 February 2001. Appeals to the Supreme Court of the Netherlands, and then to the European Court of Human Rights both failed.

== Defence argument ==
The defence argued that the fire evidence was consistent with a mattress fire, caused by smoking in bed. The reconstruction attempts, in which the fire was started using six litres of petrol and a naked flame, yielded quite different fire damage. Witnesses reported that Davies was a smoker. There were cigarette butts in the bathroom, a pack of cigarettes and a lighter on the floor. However the prosecution argued that she did not smoke because no ash tray was found in her bedroom. Moreover, a police fire investigator stated that the idea that smoking in bed caused fire was a myth. The judge did not allow the defence to present data from the Dutch Central Bureau of Statistics which show that this is one of the most common causes of house fires.

The "smoking problem" relates to fires started by smouldering combustion. Fire statistics draw attention to the magnitude of the smouldering as the leading cause of fire deaths in residential areas. More than 25% of the fire deaths in the United States are attributed to smoulder-initiated fires, with similar figures in other developed countries (i.e. New Zealand).

== Media coverage ==
A 1997 episode of The Cook Report, Lady Killer? was devoted to the case. Here, Cook and her parents also raised suspicions about the death of Sweeney's previous wife, Beverly Flint.

Dutch crime reporter Peter R. de Vries was reportedly surprised that Sweeney was convicted in view of the flimsiness of the evidence. The Dutch philosopher of science Ton Derksen has studied this case together with four other controversial recent Dutch cases, and argues that the Public Prosecution service is committing the same major errors in all of them.
