= Jisoo Han =

South Korean diver (born 1983)

- Hangul: 한지수
- RR: Han Jisu
- MR: Han Chisu

Jisoo Han (Korean: 한지수; born c. October 1983) is a South Korean underwater diving instructor who was held in Honduras. She was jailed for 110 days and was placed under house arrest for 306 days in connection with the death of Dutch tourist Mariska Mast at the Honduran island of Roatán. Han proclaimed her innocence and appealed to roommate Daniel Ian Ross, a suspect in the case who fled to Australia, to come forward and exonerate her.

Han's uncle Sung-ho Choi filed petitions for her release with Amnesty International. The case was brought to the attention of South Korean president Lee Myung-bak and Honduran president Porfirio Lobo Sosa. On October 16, 2010, Han was acquitted of the murder and remains in Honduras pending the outcome of an appeal by the prosecution.

== Background ==
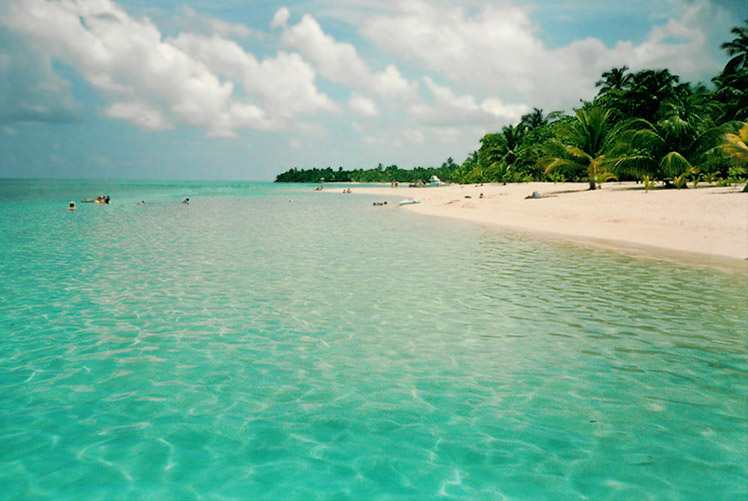
Han lived in the West End district of Roatán while training to be a Divemaster.

Han came to Roatán on June 10, 2008, to learn to become a scuba diving instructor. She assisted instructor Daniel Ian Ross, then 29 years old, in the course of her PADI Divemaster training at Coconut Tree Divers. She moved into Ross' apartment in the West End district on August 15 to save money by sharing the rent. Ross, a dual citizen of the United Kingdom and Australia, allegedly arrived in March of that year and may have been working illegally in Roatán at that time.

What beautiful nature. I enjoyed every minute of my time in Honduras. I thought it might even be a good place to live.

— Jisoo Han

== Death of Mariska Mast ==
On August 21, 2008, 23-year-old Mariska Esmeralda Mast, a schoolteacher from the Netherlands, took a diving course at Coconut Tree Divers with Ross and other instructors. Han said she was preparing for her instructor exam outside of the dive shop at that time. Mast's travel companion Barbara Mehsner stated that Mast complained of having breathing problems after their last dive.

According to Han, she met Mast for the first time that evening at the Purple Turtle bar, while accompanied by Ross and other guests. Mehsner said Mast drank with Ross that night and was infatuated with him; Mast told Mehsner that Ross had kissed her. Han stated that she went home alone at around 11:30 p.m. to go to sleep. Ross and Mast arrived at the apartment minutes later. In Ross' statement to police, Mast collapsed in the bathroom at around 3 a.m., hitting her head and chipping her tooth. Han said she brought some ice to tend to a cut above Masts' eye and returned to bed after Ross said he could handle the situation. Han allegedly woke up at around 6 a.m. when Ross yelled her name because Mast was having trouble breathing. Han said Mast was naked in Ross' bed and had defecated on herself. Han alerted neighbors to call for an ambulance. Ross said that he attempted cardiopulmonary resuscitation when Mast stopped breathing. Han joined Ross to take Mast to the hospital in the back of the landlady's truck. Ross alleged that he was unable to converse in Spanish with the doctors, who sent him away. Mehsner said she was told that Mast hit her head when she fell in the apartment. Ross stated that he returned to the apartment where he "cleaned up the mess" with the housekeeper and claimed to be unaware that he was removing vital evidence because Mast had been pronounced dead. According to the police, the landlady witnessed Ross cleaning up the scene before they could arrive. Han said that a neighbor's wife had cleaned the apartment, which was sealed as a crime scene. A police officer who inspected the apartment found "six packets of pills and a blood stain."

=== Initial investigation ===
Ross was arrested and held for five days at a Coxen Hole jail, where he was visited by British consul Mat Harper. Ross told the court that he did not want Mast to come to his apartment on the night she died. British officials in Honduras stated that Mast's initial autopsy was "inconclusive" and were uncertain whether Ross would be charged. Han was summoned to the court to make a statement and answer questions as a witness. Ross was conditionally released after surrendering his British passport and was instructed not to leave the island by the Honduran authorities, who were then unaware of his dual citizenship. Ross used his Australian passport to leave the country the next day, while a memorial was being held for Mast. Han said she had not seen Ross since.

Dutch diplomats and private investigators visited Roatán and pressured Honduran investigators to revisit the case. A new forensic report stated that Mast died of blunt force injuries and asphyxiation with evidence of strangulation. Trace amounts of amphetamines were found in her blood. Honduran forensic pathologist Heybee Yessenia Caballero reported that Mast's bruises were consistent with defensive injuries and concluded her death was a "homicide, from the legal medical point of view." An international arrest warrant was issued for Ross through Interpol.

According to Han, she passed her Divemaster certification about a month after the incident and left Roatán. After staying in the United States for about three weeks, she returned to South Korea. At the end of December 2008, Han went to Dahab, Egypt where she taught diving to other Koreans.

=== Arrest and extradition ===
On August 27, 2009, Han was detained at Cairo International Airport on an Interpol warrant as she was leaving Egypt to return to Korea. After questioning by an Interpol inspector, Han said she was sent to a "chicken cage" jail cell in Cairo where she had to sleep on a concrete floor. Han said that her request to contact the Korean consulate in Egypt was denied. Three days after Han's arrest, Ross fled from Singapore to Australia, which does not have an extradition treaty with Honduras, and denied responsibility for the death through his lawyers. Australian authorities will not honor an Interpol red notice, which requests extradition.

On September 22, 2009, Han was extradited back to Roatán via the Netherlands while in Interpol custody. After a short court hearing which Han said she did not understand, she was sent to La Ceiba prison. Han said she was scared of the prison shop "because there are a lot of rapists amongst the males." Han praised her father who visited her at the prison and befriended the guards to make sure that she was treated well. On December 14, 2009, Han was released from the prison on $10,000 bail and has been allowed to remain under house arrest at a church in San Pedro Sula until her trial.

=== Media coverage and reaction ===
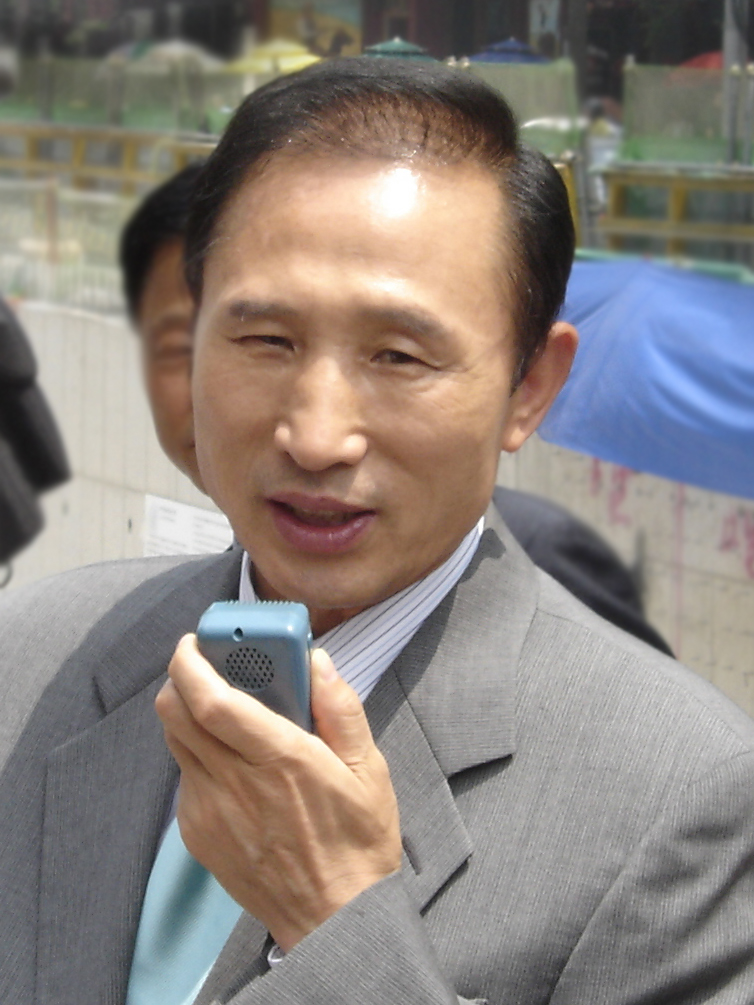
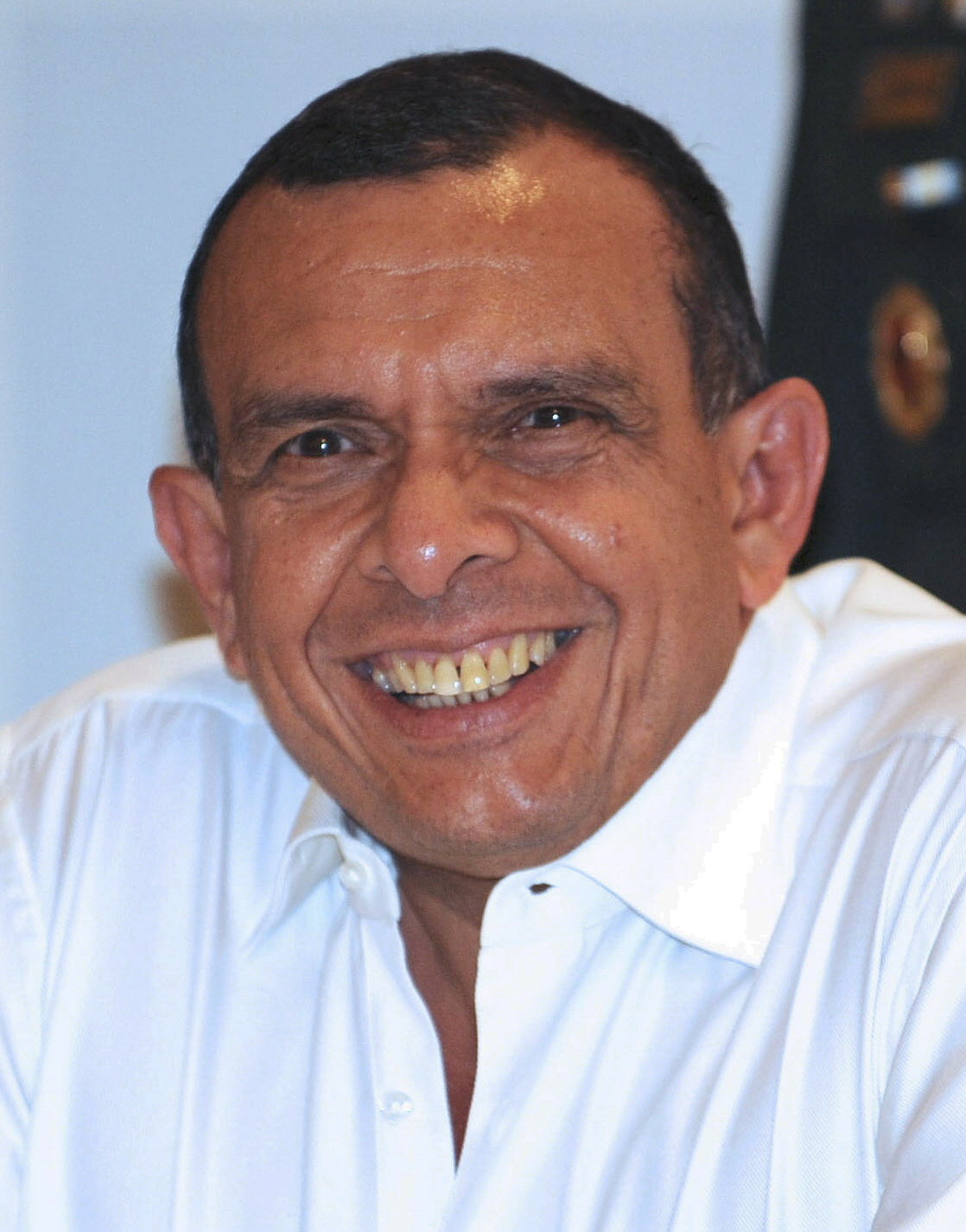
South Korean president Lee Myung-bak spoke about the case with Honduran president Porfirio Lobo Sosa.

Han publicly appealed to Ross to come forward and exonerate her. Mariska's father Herbert Mast also pleaded with Western Australian authorities to extradite Ross to answer questions about the case. Mariska's sister Amanda said that Ross never contacted the Mast family to explain what had happened. Ross stated that he wanted to get on with his life and asked for privacy. Han's uncle Sung-ho Choi called the charges "total nonsense" and filed petitions with Amnesty International to seek his niece's release.

I want to know the truth but I am not the one who has the key... I don't know if he might be able to help clear my name but it would be great if he can and does.

— Jisoo Han, September 2010

On June 29, 2010, South Korean president Lee Myung-bak met with Honduran president Porfirio Lobo Sosa at the 2010 summit of the Central American Integration System (SICA) and brought up Han's case, stating: "A young Korean woman is on trial in Honduras. I hope you will pay special attention to the issue."

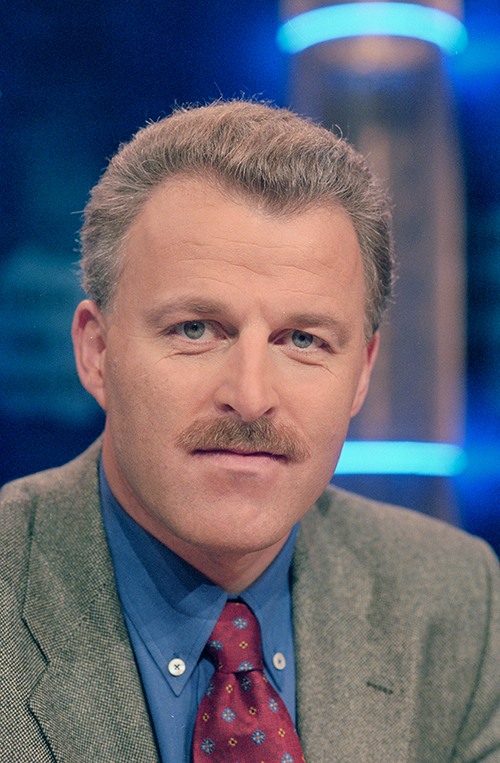
Dutch journalist Peter R. de Vries attempted to interview Daniel Ian Ross in Australia about the case.

In August 2010, Dutch crime reporter Peter R. de Vries traveled to Subiaco, Western Australia to interview Ross about the case. Ross called the police when De Vries attempted to contact him at his home on August 19. De Vries was arrested and paid a $200 fine for disobeying a police order to move on. De Vries responded to the arrest by stating: "I didn't touch him, I didn't insult him, I didn't threaten him... This is a homicide case and I tracked him down and now you're putting me in jail. That's the world upside down." On September 6, a Western Australian magistrate rejected an application by Ross for a restraining order against De Vries, who had by then left the country. On November 14, De Vries aired a 3 1/2 hour investigative program about the case on Dutch television. A follow-up report aired on November 22, 2010.

Something may be being organised as a result of the interest by these Dutch journalists.

— Inspector Dominic Wood, Western Australia Police

The dive community and police have presented several theories for Mast's death, including injuries sustained from her accidental fall, decompression sickness mixed with alcohol, battery during an attempted rape, or an accident during rough sex.

=== Trial ===
Han's trial was scheduled to be held at Coxen Hole from October 14 to 15, 2010. The Korean Ministry of Foreign Affairs and Trade sent a diplomat and a forensic expert from the Korean National Institute for Scientific Investigation to assist with the case. Han was defended by attorney Félix Antonio Ávila Ortíz against charges that could have imprisoned her for up to 30 years in Honduras. An additional autopsy report was submitted by Han's defense that indicated that Mast's death may have been caused by a combination of alcohol and drugs. On October 16, Han was found not guilty in a unanimous verbal ruling by a three-judge panel of the regional court of Roatán. However, the formal hearing to release Han was postponed on November 5 and again on November 19. The official verdict acquitting Han was finally delivered on November 24, 2010. The prosecution has appealed the ruling, though Korean ministry officials believe it unlikely to be overturned. Herbert Mast said that he was not shocked by the verdict. Han plans to return to South Korea.

I thought I was going to break down when the verdict was reached, but it didn't really hit me right away... After I spoke with my father from Korea and took other congratulatory calls, I realized I was found not guilty and was really pleased.

— Jisoo Han, October 2010

After the verdict was announced, Daniel Ian Ross announced through his lawyer from Australia that he was "delighted" that the court case supported his claim that he was not responsible for the death of Mariska Mast. However, Honduran authorities are still seeking Ross for questioning over Mast's death in his apartment. Dutch consul Floris Kluck stated that authorities from Honduras and the Netherlands were working with Australia on a proposal to extradite Ross without a treaty.

There has been co-operation from lots of countries already to see that justice takes place and it would be nice if Australia would do all the best so justice for this Dutch girl takes place.

— Floris Kluck, Dutch honorary consul for Honduras

== See also ==
- Foreign relations of Australia
- Foreign relations of Honduras
- Foreign relations of South Korea
- Prisons in Honduras
