= James Files =

American attempted murderer and JFK assassination figure

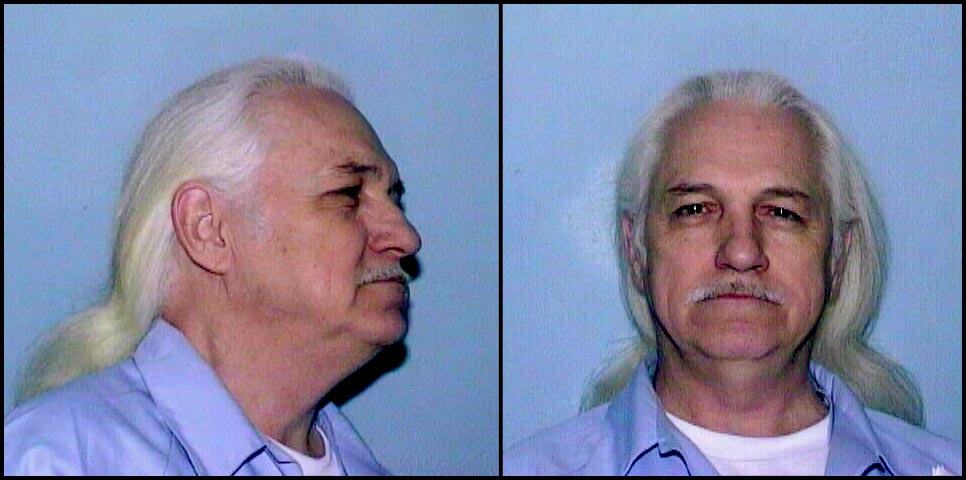
- 1994 mug shot
- Born: James Earl Files; January 24, 1942 (age 84); Oakman, Alabama, U.S.
- Other name: James Sutton
- Status: Paroled in May 2016
- Criminal charges: Attempted murder (2 counts); Aggravated discharge of a firearm Aggravated battery with a firearm Armed violence
- Penalty: 50 years

Details
- Date: May 7, 1991; 3:45 pm
- Country: United States
- State: Illinois
- Location: Round Lake Beach, Illinois
- Targets: David Ostertag; Gary Bitler
- Injured: David Ostertag
- Weapons: 9mm pistol and AK47 (spring broke in AK, so it would not fire)
- Date apprehended: May 7, 1991

James Earl Files (born January 24, 1942), also known as James Sutton, (Note: In his testimony before the Assassination Records Review Board, Robert G. Vernon said that the name "James Sutton" was an alias. In Reclaiming History: The Assassination of President John F. Kennedy, Vincent Bugliosi wrote that "James Sutton" was his "true name".) is an American former prisoner and convicted felon. In 1994, while serving a 50-year sentence for the 1991 attempted murders of two police officers, Files gave interviews stating that he was the "grassy knoll shooter" in the 1963 assassination of United States President John F. Kennedy.

He said he took one shot at Kennedy with a Remington XP-100 "fireball" gun, which was the final, fatal, head shot which caused Kennedy to jerk violently back and to the left. Files has subsequently been interviewed by others and discussed in multiple books pertaining to the assassination and related theories. In 1994, the Federal Bureau of Investigation investigated Files' allegation and found it "not credible".

In 2010, Files also implicated Charles Nicoletti and John Roselli in the assassination of Kennedy.

== Background ==
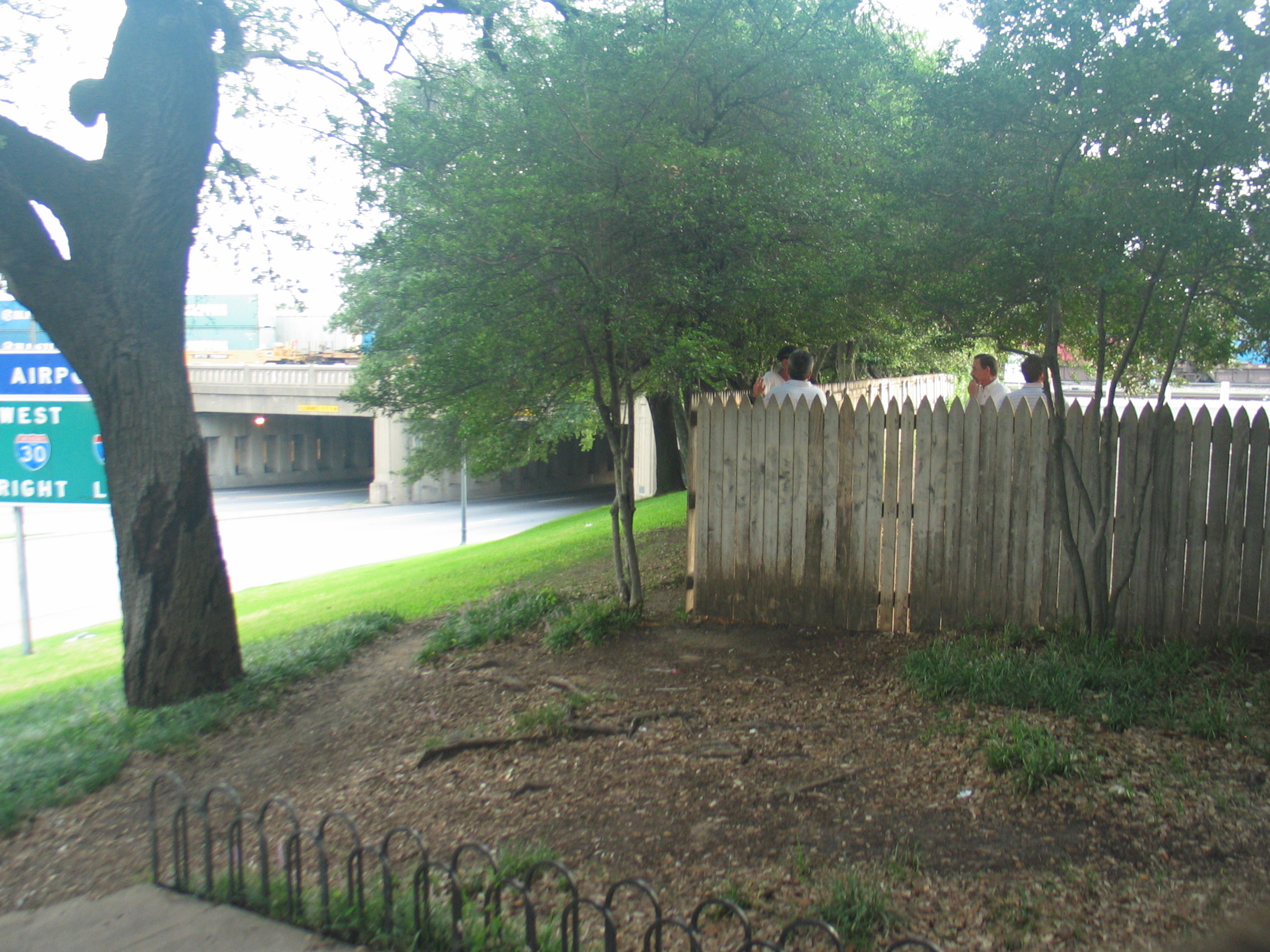
The wooden fence on the grassy knoll, where Files claims to have made his shot.

Files was born in Alabama, moved with his family to California shortly thereafter, then to an Italian neighborhood in Chicago. On May 7, 1991, Files and his friend, David Morley, were involved in a roadside shootout in Round Lake Beach, Illinois, with two police officers, Detective David Ostertag and his partner, Gary Bitler. Ostertag and Bitler tried to apprehend the two for driving a stolen vehicle. Morley shot Ostertag in the chest. Files and Morley shot at Detective Bitler, but missed. Files and Morley fled on foot and were arrested a few hours later. Files was charged with two counts of attempted murder and one count each of discharge of a firearm, aggravated battery with a firearm and armed violence. In August 1991, a jury found Files guilty of two counts of attempted murder. He was sentenced to 30 years for the shooting of Detective Ostertag and 20 years for attempting to shoot Detective Bitler. Files was imprisoned at Stateville Correctional Center in Crest Hill, Illinois, before being transferred to Danville Correctional Center in Danville, Illinois. He was paroled in May 2016.

In the early 1990s an "anonymous FBI source", later identified as Zack Shelton, told Houston private investigator Joe West about an Illinois penitentiary inmate who might have information about the Kennedy assassination. On August 17, 1992, West interviewed Files at Stateville Correctional Center. After West's death in 1993, his family requested that his friend, Houston television producer Bob Vernon, take over the records concerning the story. Vernon is the owner of a bullet casing with teeth marks on it, even though it was not found until 1987.

== Critical analysis ==
Vincent Bugliosi, author of the 2007 book Reclaiming History: The Assassination of President John F. Kennedy, characterized Files as "the Rodney Dangerfield of Kennedy assassins", a reference to comedian Dangerfield's repeated claim that he got no respect. Though Bugliosi believes there was no conspiracy to kill Kennedy, he notes how among those who do believe in such a conspiracy very few believe Files's claims warrant serious attention. However, conspiracy author Jerome Kroth described Files as "surprisingly credible" and said his story "is the most believable and persuasive" about the assassination.
