= Sex trafficking in Thailand =

Sex trafficking in Thailand is human trafficking for the purpose of sexual exploitation and slavery that occurs in the Kingdom of Thailand. Thailand is a country of origin, destination, and transit for sex trafficking. Sexual exploitation of children is a problem, close to 40,000 children under the age of 16 are believed to be in the sex trade, working in clubs, bars, and brothels.

Sex trafficking victims in the country are from all ethnic groups in Thailand and foreigners. Children, rural people in poverty and or with little education, and migrants in Thailand are vulnerable. Thai citizens, primarily women and girls, have been sex trafficked into other countries in Asia and different continents. Many are forced into prostitution and or marriage and unfree labour, as well as forced surrogacy. Sex trafficked victims are threatened and experience physical and psychological trauma. They contract sexually transmitted diseases from rapes, and abuse and malnutrition are common. There has been an increase in cybersex trafficking in 21st century Thailand. The global spread of high-speed internet and increasing computer, tablet, and smartphone ownership has fueled online sex abuse and virtual prostitution. Some victims are coerced to be in pornographic films and live streams paid by clients worldwide.

The government of Thailand has been criticized for its response to sex trafficking. The identification of sex trafficked persons is limited and there is a low rate of prosecutions and convictions of perpetrators. Corruption is widespread and some officials, police, and the military have been complicit.

== History ==
During the 18th century, Thailand underwent major industrialization, causing food and land prices to increase. This resulted in people moving to work in factories located in the city. People earning more money created an increased demand for prostitution in the city. Commercialized sex in Thailand was a small industry at this time.

The sex industry mainly flourished in the 1950s to 1970s during the Korean and Vietnam wars. Women from poverty-stricken areas of Thailand flocked to areas where military men were stationed and offered them sexual services in order to earn income. After the wars, Japanese investors became interested in Thailand and began investing in architecture, electronics, and the sex industry.

It is estimated that during the 1990s, at least 400,000 people were engaged in the sex industry, 79% of whom were women and children. Between 1993 and 1995, it is estimated that prostitution produced an annual income between 22.5 and 27 billion dollars. Today, Thailand's sex industry services roughly 3 to 5 million regular customers and is worth over 6.4 billion dollars.

== Patterns of exploitation ==
With regard to sex trafficking of Thai citizens, there are two general scenarios that exist in Thailand. The older scenario is one where an individual is recruited from a village to move to a larger town, where they are forced into the sex industry. Sometimes, they may be transported to a foreign country. A more recent scenario is one in which a person is transported from a village directly to a foreign country. The Foundation for Women found that women in the one-step direct recruitment pattern are more likely to be exposed to harsher forms of sexual exploitation. Once a person is transported to the destination country, they are forced into prostitution, sometimes serving locals and sometimes sex tourists, depending on the location.

In Thailand, local women, men, and children are trafficked into other countries, especially wealthier Asian countries. It is estimated that 100,000 to 200,000 Thai females work in a variety of overseas venues where sex is sold. The number of trafficked Thai females in Japan alone is between 50,000 and 70,000. Most of these females are between the ages of 12 and 16 and are sent to brothels in the destination country.

Trafficking in Thailand is not limited to Thai citizens; many migrants from other countries are trafficked into Thailand to work in the Thai sex industry. In recent years, there have been numerous cases of Burmese, Cambodians, and Lao trafficked into Thai brothels in northern provinces such as Chiang Mai and Chiang Rai, central and eastern provinces such as Trat, Samut Prakan, Samut Sakhon, Chonburi, and Chumphon, and Songkhla, Narathiwat, and Pattani near the southern Malaysian border. More than 80,000 people have been sold into the Thai sex industry since 1990. The majority of sex workers in Thailand are foreigners and more than 60% of females entering the country to work in the sex industry are under the age of 18. There are 75,000 prostituted children in Thailand. This includes both children trafficked into Thailand and local children.

== Suspected causes ==
Academics and experts alike are unable to agree on one specific cause for people entering the sex industry through trafficking, but rather cite multiple economic and cultural factors.

=== Economic causes ===
The economy of Thailand is considered one of the driving forces of trafficking because many families are poor farmers, such as those in the north. Lisa Rende Taylor, an anthropologist who has conducted studies on sex trafficking in Thailand, found that commercial sex work is a lucrative industry based on the economic inequality and disparities between Thailand's rural areas and Bangkok, and between Thailand and wealthier Asian nations.

Economic strife does not only influence those native to Thailand, but to those who are trafficked into Thailand itself. Victims of trafficking that come from other nations are "easily deceived or lured because they face poverty, unemployment, broken families, and unstable governments" in their countries of origin.

=== Familial responsibility ===
Other experts believe that poverty and lack of education are not the main causes behind the trafficking of Thai people. Many suspect that people sell sex because they have been coerced, abandoned, kidnapped, or sold into virtual slavery to pay off parental debts. Children often try a variety of other jobs such as scavenging, working in sweatshops, or begging. These jobs, however, do not pay well enough to convince children to not go into the better paying jobs in the sex industry. Prostitution may represent a way for a girl to earn enough money to maintain and enhance her family's property and status in her home village. Rende Taylor's research demonstrated how among Thai girls from both poor and better off families may become trafficked. In addition, education actually increased the risk of a rural girl being trafficked, due to the expectations and opportunity costs of that education. That is, girls who are allowed to study through the 9th or even 12th grade as compared with sisters who may not have been able to study as long may have great expectations for their earning potential, likely in a larger town or city. These girls are especially at risk of being recruited and forced into sex trafficking, since, once in the city, they may not be able to get the job they envisioned, yet will be reluctant to return home penniless. Many people involved in the sex industry may also feel an obligation to their family to repay for past sacrifices, with money being used as a way to improve the family's well-being and status.

Rende Taylor also found that when there is more than one daughter within the family, it is usually the middle or youngest child that ends up the sex industry, not the eldest. The eldest daughter within a Thai family usually stays at home to assist her parents in maintaining the house, farm, and younger siblings. It is the middle-born daughters who are expected to financially assist the family. Youngest daughters usually receive more schooling than their elder sisters due to the earnings of older siblings; however, this may be a risk factor for youngest daughters being recruited and/or forced into the sex industry as well.

=== Religious beliefs ===
More than 90% of Thailand's population is Buddhist. Buddhist beliefs, especially in northern Thailand, contribute to community acceptance of prostitution and sex trafficking. Thai Buddhists hold that "each person’s soul inhabits many physical bodies over time, with the quality of each life influenced by the soul's store of merit". Merit can be earned by providing aid to one's parents, which can be through earnings from sex work, despite the nature of the work itself. The merit gained would, in essence, bless the victims in their next life, negating the effects of having been involved in the sex industry. Nearly US$300 million is transferred yearly by trafficked persons engaged in prostitution back to their families in Thailand.

=== Business culture ===
According to Boonyarit Nipavanit, a local official in Mae Hong Son, teenage girls are often procured for superiors and VIPs in both the private and public sectors, in a practice known as “treat to food, lay down the mat".

=== Methods used by traffickers ===
Common methods of trafficking include, but are not limited to, physical force, coercion such as debt relief for family, job, marriage, threats, and passport theft. Girls can also be kidnapped or lured into the industry by promises of high paying work as dancers, waitresses, domestic servants, or sale representatives.

Recruitment is another method commonly used by traffickers. Girls are recruited at a young age into the sex industry, often by former prostitutes who are agents of a brothel or "massage parlor". These agents have a specific agenda. They scout poor villages and when a potential candidate is found, the agent offers a down payment for the girl to her parents. The agent returns when the girl is 12 to make the final payment and to pick up the "goods."

=== Appeal of young women and children ===
One reason that young women and girls may be disproportionately recruited into prostitution is the demand of the sex industry clientele. Advertised promises of youth, virginity, and innocence have led to increased demands for children in the global sex trade. Research has found that the characteristics that men find attractive in Thai women are "simplicity, loyalty, affection, and innocence."

There are two types of men who use trafficked children. The first type is preferential abusers who actively seek out sex with children of a particular age. The second type is situational abusers who might have sex with children if an offer is made. Their sexual preference is not necessarily for children. These men are commonly sex tourists, or those who travel to other countries specifically looking for sex.

The increasing number of people with AIDS is another reason for the increasing recruitment of young girls. The sex industry uses AIDS as an excuse "under the false pretense that younger girls will not be infected with the disease".

=== Sex trafficking of men and boys in Thailand ===
Men and boys are trafficked for sex in Thailand as well as women and girls. While largely denied victim status by the Thai government and global anti-trafficking movement more broadly, they are exploited in similar ways to female victims, yet face specific sets of vulnerabilities. Central factors that contribute to a male's vulnerability to being trafficked for sex in Thailand include national and ethnic background, citizenship status, substance abuse, family financial status, employment history (specifically in the sex industry), and local law enforcement practices. A large number of male sex workers in Chiang Mai are migrants from Myanmar or neighboring hill tribes in the North of Thailand, who because the government will not grant them citizenship are forced to pursue employment in the informal labor sector, where they become highly vulnerable to both sex and labor trafficking.

Men and boys who are involved in the sex industry in Thailand generally work in massage parlors, show/KTV bars, or as "freelancers" in a variety of establishments. A 2017 study on the prevalence of men working in Chiang Mai's sex trade found 80% of respondents to be between the ages of 15–24. Studies have shown strong correlations between ethnic background and the area of the sex industry in which a given male works or is trafficked. In Chiang Mai, for example, the majority of Burmese migrant men working in the commercial sex trade operate out of bars and nightclubs, while those from Thailand's hill tribes and other parts of the rural north tend to staff the city's massage parlors. Many men and boys from these ethnic minority groups are drawn into the exploitative sex trade due to the low wages and discrimination found in other, more formal sectors of the economy (such as construction or factory work).

==== Recognition of males in the global fight against trafficking ====
Few legal or social services are available to the men and boys involved in Thailand's sex industry, and they are subject to complex social stigmatization surrounding denial of male victimhood along with discrimination against migrant/stateless status, ethnic background, language spoken, literacy/education level, and sexuality. The lack of conversation, advocacy, legal/social support services, and academic work around the sexual exploitation of males can be traced to larger social discourses surrounding male sexuality, dominance, and behavior. Media representations of masculinity and sexual dominance contribute to the idea that men cannot be victims, especially in regards to sex-related crimes. The lack of public knowledge and attention to male victimhood and vulnerability is strongly reflected in the quality of services and strength of legal frameworks available to male victims of sex trafficking . Experts describe the "perceived agency and resilience in young males" to be a strong force in deterring male victims from seeking the support they need, and discouraging male-inclusive anti-trafficking support networks from forming in the first place. Within the spare social support frameworks for male victims that do exist, the specific vulnerabilities of different populations—regarding nationality and migration status, sexual orientation, drug use, socioeconomic status, and health status are often unaddressed, leaving crucial groups' needs unmet. The double stigma that surrounds male victims of sex trafficking, involving homosexuality and sex work more broadly, makes it incredibly difficult for male victims to come forward and seek help or even to organize. Male victims are often legal targets for arrests for prostitution and face higher rates of police violence and brutality than female victims.

=== Risks for trafficked individuals ===
HIV/AIDS, STDs, and pregnancy are major risks for those involved in the sex industry. Most victims are likely to be under control of their owners after being trafficked into a new country, so they are not in the position to negotiate with customers to protect themselves from disease or pregnancy.

In the 1990s, Thai sex workers believed that they would get pregnant or be infected with a disease only if it was their fate. Due to this belief, many female victims never used contraceptives or received medical checkups and thus were at a higher risk of contracting a disease or getting pregnant.

While HIV/AIDS poses a major risk to victims of sex trafficking everywhere, some scholars criticize the academic publications that exist specifically around men and boys in the sex industry for focusing too heavily on HIV/AIDS and presenting them as living health risks to society rather than victims who need the same legal, psychological, and social support services as everyone else.

== Protection and prevention ==
=== Laws ===
Several laws were enacted in the 1990s to help prevent sex trafficking and to protect those who are trafficked. In 1992, Thailand initiated a program to work with families and society to alter positive attitudes toward the sexual exploitation of children. Legal measures were also implemented to suppress sexual trafficking. In 1996, Thailand introduced a new law on the suppression and prevention of prostitution. Prostitution by adults is considered an offence that "upsets public morality" in Thailand. Those convicted are fined, and minors are forcibly rehabilitated. If parents were directly involved in the selling of their children to sex traffickers, they are severely punished as well.

In 1997, Thailand enacted a new anti-trafficking law. This law included women, girls, and boys of all nationalities trafficked into Thailand. Thai law has yet to formally recognize the adult male victim population, a highly stigmatized group that is often rendered invisible by local lawmakers and anti-trafficking advocates alike. Thailand initiated a Memorandum of Understanding for the Treatment of Trafficking of Women and Children in 1999. It is a guideline for responsible governmental agencies to take legal action against traffickers and "provide social assistance to trafficking women and children of Thai and other nationalities." In addition, Thailand has a number of bilateral memoranda of understanding (MOUs) for anti-trafficking cooperation with the governments of Cambodia (2003), Lao PDR (2005), and Myanmar (2009). The Thai-Lao and Thai-Myanmar MOUs are executed through action plans as well as case management meetings to handle cross-border issues.

In 2008, Thailand enacted a newer, more comprehensive anti-trafficking law, the Anti-Trafficking in Person Act BE 2551, with a definition of "human trafficking" in line with the international definition contained in the Palermo Protocol of the United Nations Convention on Transnational Organized Crime. Thus, this law criminalizes both sex and labor trafficking, of men, women, and children of any nationality.

Thailand is also implementing its second national plan to suppress and prevent human trafficking. "National plans of action" are written by a national committee, which is composed of representatives from both governmental and non-governmental organisations. Thailand offers bounties for the arrest of foreign traffickers operating in its territory.

=== International involvement ===
Thailand is a member of the COMMIT Process (Coordinated Mekong Ministerial Initiative Against Human Trafficking), a six-country anti-trafficking framework for cooperation between the Mekong governments of Cambodia, Mainland China, Lao PDR, Myanmar, Thailand, and Vietnam. The COMMIT Process is underpinned by a MOU, which is effected by sub-regional action plans and national annual workplans. On 17 October 2013, Thailand ratified the Palermo Protocol on Trafficking in Persons, part of the United Nations Convention on Transnational Organized Crime, includes a universal definition of human trafficking and requires state parties to provide assistance to trafficked persons and establish mechanisms for cooperation, if appropriate and possible in accordance with their international laws. As of December 2014, it has been ratified by 166 countries including Thailand.

== Non-governmental organizations ==
The Foundation of Child Understanding (THAILAND FOCUS) conducts anti-sex trafficking efforts in Thailand. The Thai government has also partnered with non-profit organizations to combat sex trafficking and forced prostitution. The Thai government partnered with the Pavena Foundation for Children and Women, a public benefit organization to assist the victims of sex trafficking and forced prostitution. Since 1999, it has assisted more than 9,000 victims of sexual attacks. According to the Pavena Foundation's records, these cases have been on the rise.
