= 8th Shorty Awards =

Awards show for short-form social web media content

The 8th Annual Shorty Awards
- Date: April 11, 2016
- Location: The Times Center, New York City
- Hosted by: Mamrie Hart
- Website: http://shortyawards.com

The 8th Annual Shorty Awards, honoring the best in social media, took place on April 11, 2016, at The Times Center in New York City. The ceremony was hosted by YouTube comedian Mamrie Hart, who was accompanied by Flula Borg as the ceremony DJ. There was a musical performance from Nico & Vinz.

== Influencer winners and nominees ==
Nominations were announced on January 19, 2016, with public voting closing on February 18, 2016. Winners are listed first and in boldface.

=== Arts & Entertainment ===
**Best Actor**: **Dwayne Johnson**; Lin-Manuel Miranda; Michael B. Jordan; Ryan Reynolds; Tom Hanks; Zac Efron	**Best Actress**: **Taraji P. Henson**; Cara Delevingne; Elizabeth Banks; Kerry Washington; Uzo Aduba; Zendaya
**Best Celebrity**: **Jimmy Fallon**; Chrissy Teigen; Miss Piggy; RuPaul; Snoop Dogg; Weird Al	**Best Comedian**: **Kevin Hart**; Aidy Bryant; Amy Schumer; Aziz Ansari; Nick Offerman; Nicole Byer
**Best in Dance**: **Misty Copeland**; Amymarie Gaertner; Chloe Lukasiak; Dominic "D-Trix" Sandoval; Maddie Ziegler; Roberto Bolle	**Best Musician**: **Adele**; Drake; Kanye West; Little Mix; Nicki Minaj; Pearl Jam
**Best Singer**: **Taylor Swift**; Cher; Demi Lovato; Ellie Goulding; Rihanna; Selena Gomez; Troye Sivan	**Best TV Show**: **The Late Late Show with James Corden**; Broad City; Empire; Game of Thrones; Saturday Night Live; Teen Wolf

=== Team Internet ===
**Best Vine Artist**: **Zach King**; Alex Draws; Gerald Andal; Kayla Christine; Meagan Cignoli; Reno Shaw	**Best Vine Comedian**: **MeechOnMars**; **Mikaela Long**; Aaron Doh; Gabriel Gundacker; J. Cyrus; Jamie Costa
**Best Vine Musician**: **Us the Duo**; 80Fitz; Marcus Perez; Rachel Bobbit; Ruth B; Trench	**Best Web Series**: **Good Mythical Morning**; Braless With Laci Green; Decoded With Franchesca Ramsey; Honest Trailers; Oscar's Hotel for Fantastical Creatures; You Do You
**Best YouTube Comedian**: **Roman Atwood**; Jus Reign; Mamrie Hart; Mike Falzone; Miranda Sings; Ryan Higa	**Best YouTube Ensemble**: **PrankvsPrank**; Dan & Phil; Dude Perfect; JacksGap; SUP3RFRUIT; The Slow Mo Guys
**Best YouTube Guru**: **Sprinkle of Glitter**; Andrea's Choice; Desi Perkins; Kandee Johnson; Patrick Starr; Rachel Levin	**Best YouTube Musician**: **Lindsey Stirling**; Alessia Cara; Ally Hills; Flula; Lil Dicky; Todrick Hall
**Snapchatter of the Year**: **DJ Khaled**; Cakes1toDough1; Harris Markowitz; Kylie Jenner; Real Dr. Miami; Sara Hopkins	**Viner of the Year**: **King Bach**; Aaron Chewning; allicattt; Brandon Calvillo; Jay Versace; Manon Mathews
**YouTuber of the Year**: **Casey Neistat**; Ingrid Nilsen; Lilly Singh; PewDiePie; Tyler Oakley; Zoella

=== Creative & Design ===
**Best Blogger**: **Momma's Gone City**; gabifresh; Green Wedding Shoes; Nicolette Mason; Song of Style; Urban Bush Babes	**Best in Art**: **Matija Erceg**; Elle Luna; Halno; Sasha Unisex; Spencer Hibert; The Art of Plating
**Best in DIY**: **ThreadBanger**; A Beautiful Mess; Almost Makes Perfect; Joselyn Hughes; Mr. Kate; P.S. – I made this...	**Best in Fashion**: **Christian Siriano**; Chiara Ferragni; Eva Chen; Karlie Kloss; Kendall Jenner; Linda Rodin
**Instagrammer of the Year**: **Baddie Winkle**; JR; Passion Passport; Robert Jahns; Sophie Gamand; The Dogist

=== News & Media ===
**Best Animal**: **JiffPom**; BigCatDerek; Doug the Pug; Remix The Dog; Marnie the Dog; Marutaro the hedgehog; Trump Your Cat	**Best Author**: **J. K. Rowling**; **Sarah Dessen**; Andy Weir; Elizabeth Gilbert; Saeed Jones; Sloane Crosley
**Best in Food**: **Hannah Hart**; Clean Food Dirty City; How To Cake It; Samantha Lee; The Infatuation; Tiger Tomato	**Best in Healthy Living**: **Jessamyn Stanley**; Cassey Ho; Fit Men Cook; Kati Morton; Laura Sykora; Teresa Cutter
**Best in Parenting**: **SACCONEJOLYs**; Dude to Dad; Eh Bee Family; Honest Toddler; The Unmumsy Mum; What's Up MOMS	**Best in Sports**: **Stephen Curry**; Abby Wambach; LeBron James; Ronda Rousey; Serena Williams; Shaquille O'Neal
**Best Journalist**: **Katie Couric**; Glenn Greenwald; Jenna Wortham; Kara Swisher; Nicholas Kristof; Ta-Nehisi Coates	**Best Parody Account**: **Emo Kylo Ren**; Bros Being Basic; Kanye Doing Things; Millennials of New York; Rick Grimes; Tina

=== Tech & Innovation ===
**Best in Activism**: **Janet Mock**; Brandon Stanton; Emma Watson; Jesse Williams; Malala Yousafzai; Mark Ruffalo	**Best in Education**: **Khan Academy**; Adam Grant; Crash Course; Epic Rap Battles of History; Smarter Every Day; Reshma Saujani
**Best in Gaming**: **Rooster Teeth's Let's Play**; Game Grumps; jacksepticeye; Markiplier; The Game Theorists; VanossGaming; LDShadowLady	**Best in Science**: **I Fucking Love Science**; AsapSCIENCE; Kurzgesagt – In a Nutshell; SciShow; Scott Kelly; Vsauce
**Best in Weird**: **Bill Wurtz**; Amy Sedaris; Carrot Facts; How To Basic; Megan Amram; wolf pupy	**Best Podcast**: **Ear Biscuits**; Another Round With Heben and Tracy; Black Girls Talking; Nerdist; Not Too Deep With Grace Helbig; Radiolab
**Periscoper of the Year**: **Season & Snare**; Africa Miranda; Dan Snow; Katie Dunlop; Matthew Santoro; Mitch Oates	**YouNower of the Year**: **Merrell twins**; Emma McGann; Hailey Knox; Jelly and Day; RudanC; SnowMarite

=== Content ===
**GIF of the Year**: **Pizza Rat**, (Matt Little); Dancing Drake plays tennis; David Bowie; Donald Trump reaction; GIF summarizing the six Star Wars movies; Shakespearean tragedy	**Instagram Photo of the Year**: **Peace for Paris**; #lovewins; Be proud of yourself, and love yourself; Can you find me?; i bleed each month; kendalljenner
**Tumblr Blog of the Year**: **Photoshop Your Dreams**, (Margaux Espinasse); 2 Kinds of People; Cinnaman Bun; The Atlas of Beauty; The Last Message Received; Will It Beard	**Vine of the Year**: **Why You Always Lyin**, (Nicholas Fraser); Baby says hi to Adele; Drake plays tennis; Duck Army; It's an avocado....fanks; Modern Day Aladdin

== Brand & Organization Winners ==
=== By Industry ===
Best in Auto: The Greatest Interception Ever – Volvo Car USA	Best in B2B: #BallotBriefcase on Snapchat – PwC
Best Consumer Brand: Lucy The Robot – Atomic 212 Sydney, Double Robotics	Best in Education: John Jay College Insta-Challenge – VGD, John Jay College
Best in Entertainment: Peanutize me! – Ludomade, 20th Century Fox	Best in Family & Parenting: Plum Organics: Parenting Unfiltered – Something Massive, Plum Organics
Best in Fashion, Beauty & Luxury: Carol's Daughter #BornandMade – Love Social, Carol's Daughter	Best in Financial Services: Meet Halfway – CP+B LA, Noble People, PayPal, Airbnb
Best in Food & Beverage: Lovin' The Super Bowl – DDB Chicago, McDonald's	Best in Games: HUNT the TRUTH Audio Series – Ayzenberg Group, Xbox/343 Industries; LEGO Dimensions: The Ultimate Social Media Collaboration – Warner Bros. Interactive Entertainment
Best in Government & Politics: The Royal Navy Engineers Recruitment Campaign – e3, The Royal Navy	Best in Health & Fitness: #CignaRunTogether at #DisneylandHalf Marathon Weekend – Cigna
Best in Home & Decor: The First Ever Pinterest Yard Sale – Deutsch, Krylon	Best in Hospitality: Two Bellmen – Marriott International, Marriott Content Studio, SubstanceOverHype, Platform Media Group
Best in Live Events: 2015 iHeartRadio Music Festival – iHeartRadio	Best in News: The New Yorker on Social Media – The New Yorker
Best Non-Profit: Crossroads Community Street Fare Social Campaign – Saatchi & Saatchi Wellness, Crossroads Community Services; Love Has No Labels – R/GA, Ad Council	Best in Pets & Animals: RuffLife – breensmith, Friends of Animals
Best in Retail & E-Commerce: Live The Fresh Blade Shave – Dollar Shave Club	Best in Sports: #MyPlayoffsMoment – National Hockey League and Camp Jefferson
Best in Technology: Lucy The Robot – Atomic 212 Sydney, Double Robotics	Best in Television: Netflix Narcos Original Series Social Media Campaign – Mistress, Netflix
Best in Travel & Tourism: BLAH Airlines – Eleven Inc, Virgin America	Best in Wine, Beer & Spirits: Hockey Heaven – Rethink, Molson Canadian; My Tales of Whisky Yule Log – Diamond Docs on behalf of Diageo submitted by Hunter PR

=== Content and Media ===
Best Use of Animated GIFs: The Perfect GIF – Good People, Hulu	Best Contest or Promotion: Mr. Robot: Debt Deletion – ISL, NBCUniversal
Best Data Visualization: #Cokenomics – Mistress, Netflix	Best Use of Emojis: Emoji Ordering – CP+B, Domino's
Best Use of a Hashtag: #GayIsOK – Lush Cosmetics + AllOut	Best Use of Live Streaming Video: Mr. Robot: Debt Deletion – ISL, NBCUniversal
Best Use of a Meme: Straight Outta Somewhere – PMG, Beats by Dre	Best Photography and Graphics: High-Five. Give $5. Save Big Cats. – National Geographic
Best Use of Video: Wish Writer – Carat and J. Walter Thompson, Macy's	Best Use of Virtual Reality: Discovery VR – Discovery Communications

=== Agency of the Year ===
Small Agency of the Year: Atomic 212 Sydney	Mid-Size Agency of the Year: DDB Chicago
Large Agency of the Year: R/GA

=== Strategy & Engagement ===
Best Customer Service: Tale of tiger's big adventure highlights airport's commitment to customer service – Hillsborough County Aviation Authority	Best Integration with Live Television: The Voice – NBC Entertainment
Best Use of Gamification: #CatchDrogon – 360i, HBO/ Game of Thrones	Best Use of Humor: Mustang Speed Dating – Team Detroit, Ford Motor Company
Best Online Community: @SummerBreak, a single summer told over multiple platforms – AT&T, Fullscreen, The Chernin Group, Astronauts Wanted	Best in Physical & Digital: WestJet Christmas Miracle: 12,000 mini miracles – studio m, WestJet
Best Real Time Response: Adopt A Life Partner – DigitasLBi New York, Rescue Dogs Rock NYC	Best Media Buying Strategy: Lucy The Robot – Atomic 212 Sydney, Double Robotics
Best Social Media Tool: #EveryDayCare – Whirlpool, DigitasLBi and Crowdtap – DigitasLBi, Crowdtap, Whirlpool	Best Creative Use of Technology: Netflix socks – Deeplocal, Netflix

=== By Campaign ===
Best Influencer & Celebrity Campaign: My Tales of Whisky Yule Log – Diamond Docs on behalf of Diageo submitted by Hunter PR	Best Integrated Campaign: Love Has No Labels – R/GA, Ad Council
Best Mobile Campaign: Taco Bell Mobile Ordering Application – DigitasLBi, Taco Bell	Best Multi-Platform Campaign: #NewWords - Dictionary.com – Collab (www.collabcreators.com), Dictionary.com; Endless Table: Havas Worldwide Chicago, Reynolds – Social Good Campaign
Social Good Campaign: "Love Has No Labels" Diversity & Inclusion Campaign – The Ad Council; Connor's Cure – WWE

=== By Use of Platform ===
Best Use of Facebook: Silent Ads – CP+B, Hotels.com	Best Use of Instagram: Beats By Dre Straight Outta Compton – R/GA's Hustle, Beats By Dr. Dre
Best Use of Pinterest: The First Ever Pinterest Yard Sale – Deutsch, Krylon	Best Use of Snapchat: Call of Duty: Hack in Black – Edelman & AKQA, Activision
Best Use of Tumblr: CRITICS' CHOICE AWARDS FAN ART RED CAPRET – A&E Television	Best Use of Twitter: Lovin' The Super Bowl – DDB Chicago, McDonald's
Best Use of Vine: Disney Vine – Disney Interactive	Best Use of YouTube: Do You Adventure? – NORTH, CLIF Bar
Best Use of an Emerging Platform: Mr. Robot: Debt Deletion – ISL, NBCUniversal

=== By Overall Presence ===
Best Facebook Presence: AJ+: 2.2 Billion Facebook Video Views in 2015 - AJ+	Best Instagram Presence: Airbnb Instagram: @airbnb
Best Tumblr Presence: The Real Cost: Reaching youth at risk of experimenting with cigarettes - FCB Garfinkel, FDA Center of Tobacco Products	Best Twitter Presence: Casper: The Tweeting Mattress - Casper
Best YouTube Presence: Last Week Tonight - HBO
