= The New Atlanta =

- Jevon "Vawn" Sims, Emily Lipman, Africa Miranda, Tribble Reese, and Alexandra Dilworth (from left)
- Genre: Reality
- Starring: Africa Miranda; Alexandra Dilworth; Emily Lipman; Jevon "Vawn" Sims; Tribble Reese
- Country of origin: United States
- Original language: English
- No. of seasons: 1
- No. of episodes: 8

Production
- Executive producers: Angela Rae Berg; Jim Fraenkel; Michael Selditch; Mona Scott-Young; Stefan Springman; Toby Barraud
- Running time: 42 minutes
- Production companies: Eastern Entertainment; Monami Entertainment

Original release
- Network: Bravo
- Release: September 17 – October 29, 2013

The New Atlanta is an American reality television series that aired on Bravo and premiered on September 17, 2013. The series was green-lit on November 27, 2012, under the working title of Taking Atlanta. It would later emerge with its current title on July 17, 2013. The New Atlanta chronicles the lives of five young adults — Africa Miranda, Alexandra Dilworth, Emily Lipman, Jevon "Vawn" Sims, and Tribble Reese — who are building their empires and achieving their dreams in Atlanta, Georgia.

== Episodes ==
No.	Title	Original release date	U.S. viewers (millions)
1	"Dine, Dash & Party-Crash"	September 17, 2013	1.04
In the series premiere, Africa brings Emily to her friend Alex's college graduation party. Emily begins to turn heads once she becomes offended that Alex aspires to become a trophy wife. Later, Africa celebrates her birthday with a party and has invited two potential love interests — Vawn and Tribble — but Emily and Alex's continuing drama ruins the night.
2	"Ejected & Rejected"	September 24, 2013	0.79
Still at Africa's birthday extravaganza, Alex and Emily continue their argument. Tribble acquires Africa's number with the hope of possibly becoming more than just friends. Vawn would like to see Africa' perform but some technical difficulties arise.
3	"Watch Your Back"	October 1, 2013	0.80
Alex is confronted by Africa after she fails to apologize. Vawn does things that damage his friendship with Tribble. Emily is surprised when her previous boyfriend shows up.
4	"Bad Romance"	October 8, 2013	0.74
Emily and Tribble are growing weary of Vawn's motives. Emily reveals a shocking accusation about her ex-boyfriend.
5	"Sashay, Shante, Melee"	October 15, 2013	0.90
6	"Devil With the Blue Dress"	October 22, 2013	0.91
7	"Let's Get Physical"	October 27, 2013	1.13
8	"Should He Stay or Should He Go?"	October 29, 2013	N/A
