= Mountain Brook High School =

Coordinates: 33.49147°N 86.7120°W

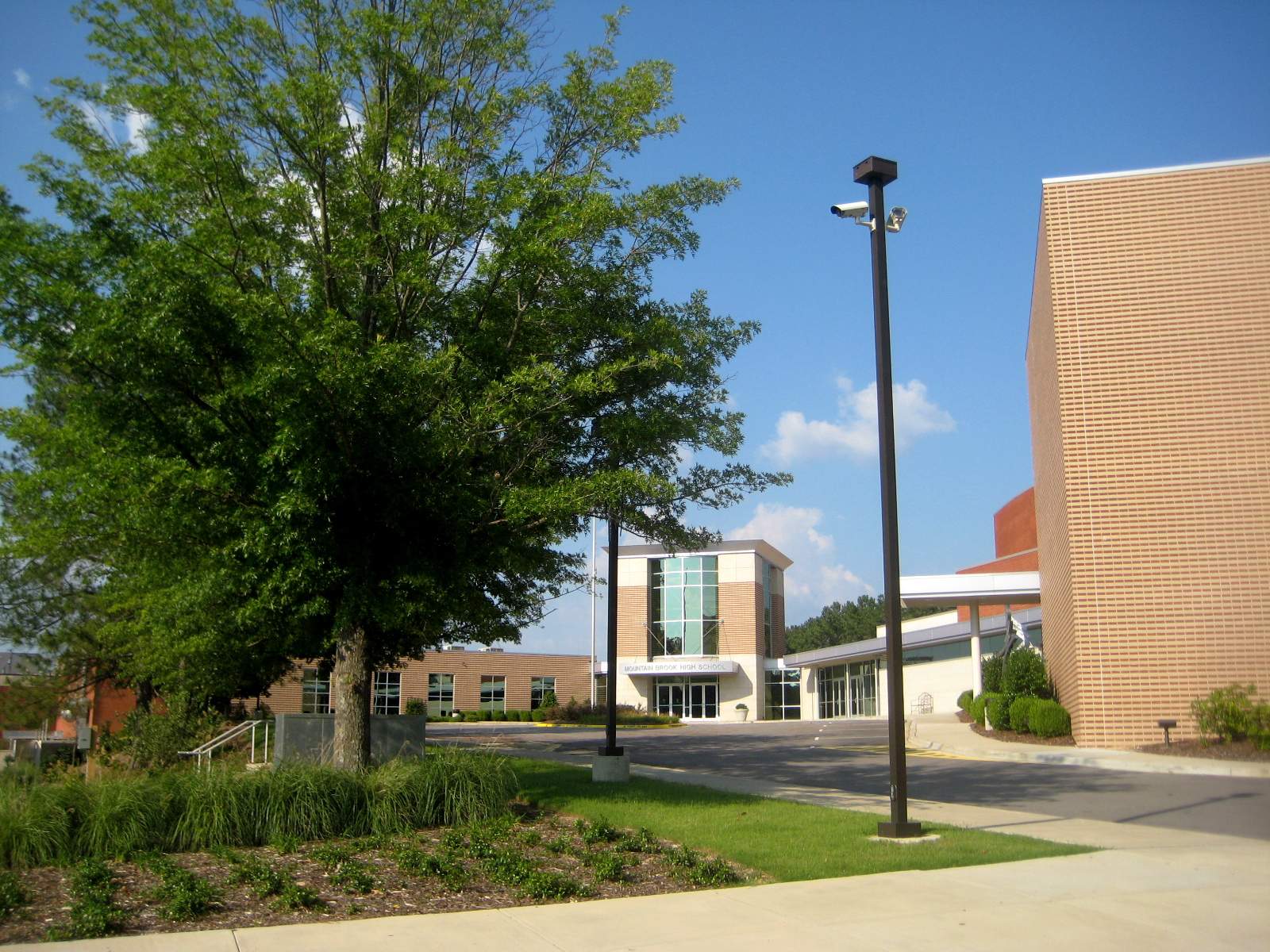
- The front entrance to MBHS in 2010

Location
- 3650 Bethune Drive; Mountain Brook, Alabama 35223; United States

Information
- School type: Public
- Founded: 1966 (60 years ago)
- School district: Mountain Brook School System
- CEEB code: 010380
- Principal: Carrie Busby
- Faculty: 98.50 (on an FTE basis)
- Grades: 10–12
- Enrollment: 970 (2023–24)
- Student to teacher ratio: 9.85
- Campus: Suburban
- Colors: Green and gold
- Athletics: AHSAA Class 6A
- Mascot: Spartan
- Team name: Spartans
- Newspaper: Sword and Shield
- Yearbook: Olympian
- Feeder schools: Mountain Brook Junior High School
- Website: mbhs.mtnbrook.k12.al.us

Mountain Brook High School (MBHS) is a three-year public high school in the city of Mountain Brook, Alabama. It is the only high school in the Mountain Brook School System. The school's colors are green and gold. Its athletic teams are known as the Spartans. MBHS competes in AHSAA Class 6A athletics.

== Recognition ==
MBHS has appeared in several rankings, including:

- MBHS was ranked 4th among the 12 Alabama schools included in the Washington Post's 2015 list of "America's Most Challenging High Schools."
- In 2014, MBHS was included among the "Top 150 high schools in the U.S." by the Daily Beast.
- In 2015, SchoolDigger ranked MBHS second among 357 high schools in the state of Alabama and first among high schools in the Birmingham-Hoover metropolitan area.
- In 2015, Niche ranked MBHS 2nd in the state of Alabama and 2nd among high schools in the Birmingham-Hoover metropolitan area.
- In 2008, The U.S. Department of Education recognized MBHS as a National Blue Ribbon School.

== Athletics ==
The Mountain Brook athletic department fields numerous sports, which all compete in the (6A) classification of Alabama High School Athletic Association (AHSAA). Mountain Brook has won state championships in 17 different AHSAA sports—9 boys' sports and 8 girls' sports. Mountain Brook leads the all-time state title count in four sports: boys tennis, girls tennis, girls cross country, and girls indoor track. The Mountain Brook Spartans hold the most state titles in AHSAA history with 203 team championships (75 boys, 128 girls).

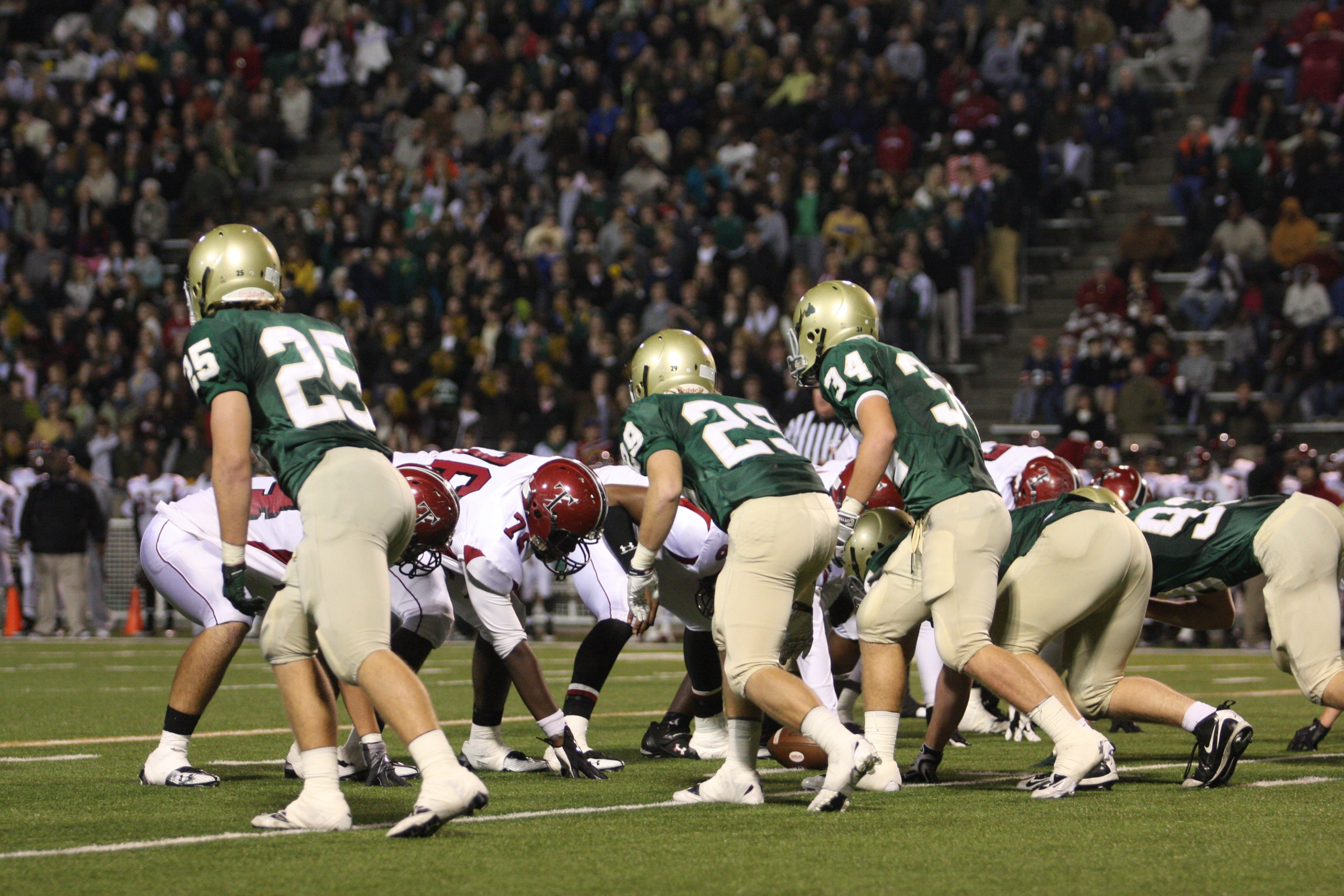
The MBHS football team in a 2010 playoff contest against Gadsden City

=== Football ===
The Mountain Brook football team competes in Class 6A of AHSAA. Mountain Brook football was first organized in 1966 and has an all-time record of 415-246-1. MBHS football has accomplished 41 winning seasons out of 59. The longest-serving head football coach in school history is Chris Yeager. He has served from 2006–present and has a record of 153-65. The Spartans’ longest-running football rivalry is with Vestavia Hills High School, trailing in the series 28-30. MBHS football currently holds 12 region championships in 1975, 1976, 1984, 1985, 1987, 1996, 1999, 2002, 2003, 2011, 2020, and 2021. The team reached its first playoff appearance and win in 1975. Since, the Spartans have had 31 playoff appearances. The Mountain Brook High School football program currently holds two AHSAA state championships in 1975 and 1976. The team also has two runner-up finishes in 1996 and 2022.

=== Boys Basketball ===
The Mountain Brook boys basketball team competes in Class 6A of AHSAA. The team is coached by Tyler Davis who holds a 109-24 record. The longest-serving head basketball coach in school history is Bucky McMillan. McMillan served from 2009-2020 and compiled a record of 333-74. MBHS basketball currently holds 18 area championships in 1968, 1991, 2001, 2003, 2005, 2010, 2012, 2013, 2014, 2015, 2017, 2018, 2019, 2020, 2021, 2022, 2023, and 2024. The team reached its first playoff appearance and win in 1968. Since, the Spartans have had 11 state tournament appearances, making it to the Elite 8 in 2003, 2005, and 2022 and the Final Four in 1968 and 2001. The team has four state runner-up finishes in 2015, 2020, 2023, and 2024. Mountain Brook High School boys basketball program currently holds six AHSAA state championships in 2013, 2014, 2017, 2018, 2019, and 2021.

=== Baseball ===
The Mountain Brook baseball team competes in Class 6A of AHSAA. The longest-serving head baseball coach in school history is Lee Gann, who has served from 2003–present. MBHS baseball currently holds 14 area championships in 1985, 1986, 1988, 1998, 2001, 2002, 2003, 2007, 2008, 2014, 2018, 2022, 2023, and 2024. The team reached its first playoff in 1985. Since, the Spartans have had 28 playoff appearances, making it to the Elite 8 in 1986, 1994, 1996, and 2003 and the Final Four in 1993.

=== Boys Soccer ===
The Mountain Brook boys soccer team competes in Class 6A of AHSAA. The longest-serving head boys soccer coach in school history is Joe Webb. Webb has served from 1996–present and holds a 494-193-58 record. Webb has led the Spartans to 17 playoff appearances, the most in school history for head soccer coaches. The team was first organized in 1973. The MBHS boys soccer team currently holds eight section championships in 2007, 2008, 2009, 2010, 2018, 2022, 2023, and 2024. The team reached its first playoff in 1996. Since, the Spartans have had 17 playoff appearances, making it to the Elite 8 in 2021 and the Final Four in 2018. The Mountain Brook High School boys soccer program currently holds one AHSAA state championship in 2022. The team also has one runner-up finish in 2009.

=== Boys Tennis ===
The Mountain Brook High School boys tennis program currently holds 29 AHSAA state championships in 1969, 1970, 1971, 1972, 1973, 1975, 1983, 1985, 1986, 1987, 1993, 1994, 1996, 1997, 1998, 2000, 2002, 2003, 2004, 2005, 2008, 2009, 2010, 2015, 2016, 2017, 2023, 2024, and 2025 (All-time record for AHSAA boys sports). The team also has 12 runner-up finishes.

=== Wrestling ===
The Mountain Brook High School wrestling program currently holds one AHSAA state championship in 2024. The team also holds three championships in the Dual format in 2023, 2024, and 2025.

=== Boys Cross Country ===
The Mountain Brook High School boys cross country program currently holds 18 AHSAA state championships in 1974, 1978, 1986, 1993, 1994, 1995, 1996, 2003, 2006, 2008, 2009, 2010, 2011, 2017, 2022, 2023, 2024, and 2025. The team also has six runner-up finishes in 1992, 2012, 2015, 2016, 2020, and 2021.

=== Boys Golf ===
The Mountain Brook boys golf program currently holds 10 AHSAA state championships in 1973, 1975, 1997, 2011, 2015, 2017, 2018, 2019, 2021, and 2022.

=== Boys Indoor Track ===
The Mountain Brook High School boys indoor track program currently holds four AHSAA state championships in 1975, 2005, 2006, and 2007.

=== Boys Swimming and Diving ===
The Mountain Brook High School boys swimming and diving program currently holds one AHSAA state championship in 1976.

=== Softball ===
The Mountain Brook softball team competes in Class 6A of AHSAA. The longest-serving head softball coach in school history is Kaitlin Griffin, who has served from 2014–present. The team holds three area championships in 2008, 2023, and 2024.

=== Girls Basketball ===
The Mountain Brook girls basketball team competes in Class 6A of AHSAA. The longest-serving head girls basketball coach in school history is David Knott, who served from 1982-1991. The team currently holds 10 girls basketball area championships in 1987, 1989, 1992, 1996, 1998, 1999, 2004, 2008, 2012, and 2024. The team has also made it to the Elite 8 playoff rounds in 1998 and 2008.

=== Volleyball ===
The Mountain Brook High School volleyball team competes in Class 6A of AHSAA. The longest-serving head volleyball coach in school history is Lori Higginbotham, who served from 1975-1989. The team holds 13 area championships in 1993, 1994, 1995, 1996, 1998, 2007, 2011, 2013, 2014, 2020, 2021, 2022, and 2023. Mountain Brook volleyball has had numerous playoff appearances, making it to the Elite 8 in 1987, 1996, and 1997, and the Final Four in 2013, 2017, 2018, and 2022. The Mountain Brook High School volleyball program currently holds seven AHSAA state championships in 2014, 2015, 2016, 2019, 2020, 2021, and 2023.

=== Girls Tennis ===
The Mountain Brook High School girls tennis program currently holds 34 AHSAA state championships in 1972, 1973, 1974, 1975, 1976, 1977, 1979, 1980, 1981, 1983, 1985, 1986, 1987, 1988, 1995, 1997, 2000, 2001, 2002, 2003, 2004, 2005, 2006, 2011, 2012, 2014, 2017, 2018, 2019, 2021, 2022, 2023, 2024, and 2025 (All-time record for all AHSAA sports). The team also holds 11 runner-up finishes.

=== Girls Soccer ===
The Mountain Brook girls soccer team competes in Class 6A of AHSAA. The team is coaches by Adam Johnson who holds a 67-44-15 record. The longest-serving head girls soccer coach in school history is Lori Higginbotham. Higginbotham served from 1979-1998 and compiled an overall record of 201-120-11. The team currently holds nine section championships in 2002, 2003, 2004, 2005, 2006, 2008, 2009, 2010, and 2024. Mountain Brook girls soccer reached its first playoff in 1994. Since, the Spartans have had 23 playoff appearances, making it to the Elite 8 rounds in 1999, 2001, 2002, 2003, 2005, 2006, 2009, 2010, 2012, and 2022 and the Final Four rounds in 1996 and 2014. The Mountain Brook High School girls soccer program currently holds five AHSAA state championships in 1994, 1995, 2008, 2013, and 2024.

=== Girls Cross Country ===
The Mountain Brook girls cross country team competes in Class 6A of AHSAA. The team previously had a 13-year state championship winning streak from 2003-2015. The Mountain Brook High School girls cross country program currently holds 28 AHSAA state championships in 1974, 1975, 1977, 1990, 1994, 1995, 1996, 1997, 2000, 2001, 2003, 2004, 2005, 2006, 2007, 2008, 2009, 2010, 2011, 2012, 2013, 2014, 2015, 2021, 2022, 2023, 2024, and 2025 (All-time record for AHSAA girls cross country).

=== Girls Golf ===
The Mountain Brook girls golf program currently holds 10 AHSAA state championships in 1979, 1980, 1981, 1982, 1984, 2006, 2007, 2011, 2012, and 2013.

=== Girls Track and Field ===
The Mountain Brook High School girls track and field program currently holds 14 AHSAA state championships in 1976, 1977, 1984, 1991, 1992, 1993, 1995, 2007, 2008, 2009, 2011, 2022, 2023, and 2024.

=== Girls Indoor Track ===
The Mountain Brook High School girls indoor track program currently holds 24 AHSAA state championships in 1975, 1976, 1977, 1978, 1979, 1981, 1982, 1983, 1984, 1991, 1992, 1994, 1995, 1996, 2000, 2001, 2002, 2003, 2004, 2007, 2013, 2019, 2023, and 2024 (All-time record for AHSAA girls indoor track).

=== Girls Swimming and Diving ===
The Mountain Brook High School girls swimming and diving program currently holds six AHSAA state championships in 2000, 2001, 2002, 2005, 2006, and 2009.

== Accomplishments ==
- In October 2006, Mountain Brook High School's drama department, under the direction of Pat Yates, combined with Fairfield High Preparatory School to present Christopher Sergel's dramatization of Harper Lee's To Kill a Mockingbird. The joint production received local and eventually national attention, and was featured on NBC's Today Show and NBC Nightly News. Harper Lee herself took notice and agreed to meet with the cast.
- Mountain Brook was named the top athletic program in Alabama for the 2006–2007 season by Sports Illustrated.

== Controversy ==
The school attracted national attention in 2022 for a series of antisemitic incidents. The school responded by making plans to adopt a diversity program by the Anti-Defamation League, but dropped it after complaints that the diversity program focused too heavily on race and gender. A Jewish student was reprimanded by the school for posting a video of a teacher inviting his class to give a Nazi salute during a lesson on how symbols can change over time.

== Notable alumni ==
- Anna Grace Barlow – American actress
- Nate Bland – American baseball player (born 1974)
- Courteney Cox – American actress and producer (born 1964)
- Tommy Dewey – American actor, producer (born 1978)
- Pat DuPré, former collegiate and Professional Tennis Player that was a four-time All-American for the Stanford Cardinal. Was a semifinalist at Wimbledon in 1979 and quarterfinalist at the U.S. Open that same year
- Natalee Holloway, student who disappeared on a school trip to Aruba, resulting in an international media sensation.
- Alan Hunter (VJ) – American television personality (born 1957)
- Spencer Jakab, journalist and author; Heard on the Street columnist at The Wall Street Journal
- David Jaffe – American video game designer (born 1971)
- Graeme McFarland – American football player
- Bucky McMillan – American basketball coach
- Tribble Reese – Television personality, model, and bartender (born 1985)
- Emeel Salem
- Sarah Simmons (singer) – Reality show contestant
- William Vlachos – American football player and coach (born 1988)
- Trendon Watford – American basketball player (born 2000)
