= Post Office Pies =

Restaurant in Mountain Brook, Alabama, U.S.

- Interactive map of Post Office Pies

Restaurant information
- Location: 270 Rele Street, Mountain Brook, Alabama, 35223, United States
- Coordinates: 33°29′11″N 86°46′26″W

Post Office Pies was a restaurant in Mountain Brook, Alabama. It was included in The New York Times's 2024 list of the 22 best pizzerias in the U.S.
