= Mountain Brook School System =

School district in Alabama

Coordinates: 33°30′6.38″N 86°45′13.73″W

Address
- 32 Vine Street Mountain Brook, Alabama, 35213; United States

District information
- Type: Public
- Motto: providing an effective, challenging, and engaging education for every one of our students
- Grades: K-12
- Established: 1959
- Superintendent: Dr. Richard "Dicky" Barlow
- School board: Mountain Brook Board of Education

Other information
- Website: mtnbrook.k12.al.us

The Mountain Brook School System serves the city of Mountain Brook, a suburb of Birmingham, Alabama, United States. The school system supports a city with approximately 20,600 residents.

The Mountain Brook School System comprises four elementary schools catering to kindergarten through sixth grade: Brookwood Forest Elementary School, Cherokee Bend Elementary School, Crestline Elementary School, and Mountain Brook Elementary School. Following sixth grade, students transition to Mountain Brook Junior High School, attending seventh through ninth grades. The school system operates a single high school, Mountain Brook High School, serving grades ten through twelve.

Leadership within the school system has seen minimal turnover. In 2009, the system commemorated its 50th anniversary, coinciding with the appointment of Dicky Barlow, former principal of Mountain Brook High School, as only the fourth superintendent in the system's 50-year history.

There is also a private school, Highlands Day School, within Mountain Brook's city limits, but it is not part of the Mountain Brook School System.

In 2019, Niche ranked the system the 24th best school district in America. In 2017, Mountain Brook Elementary was named a State School of Character, one of only two in Alabama to receive this honor. Schools that receive this recognition demonstrate a dedicated focus on character development. Newsweek Magazine recognized MBHS as one of the nation's top 100 high schools. In 2016, Mountain Brook Schools was named the international Outstanding District by the International Society for Technology in Education.

== Mountain Brook Board of Education ==
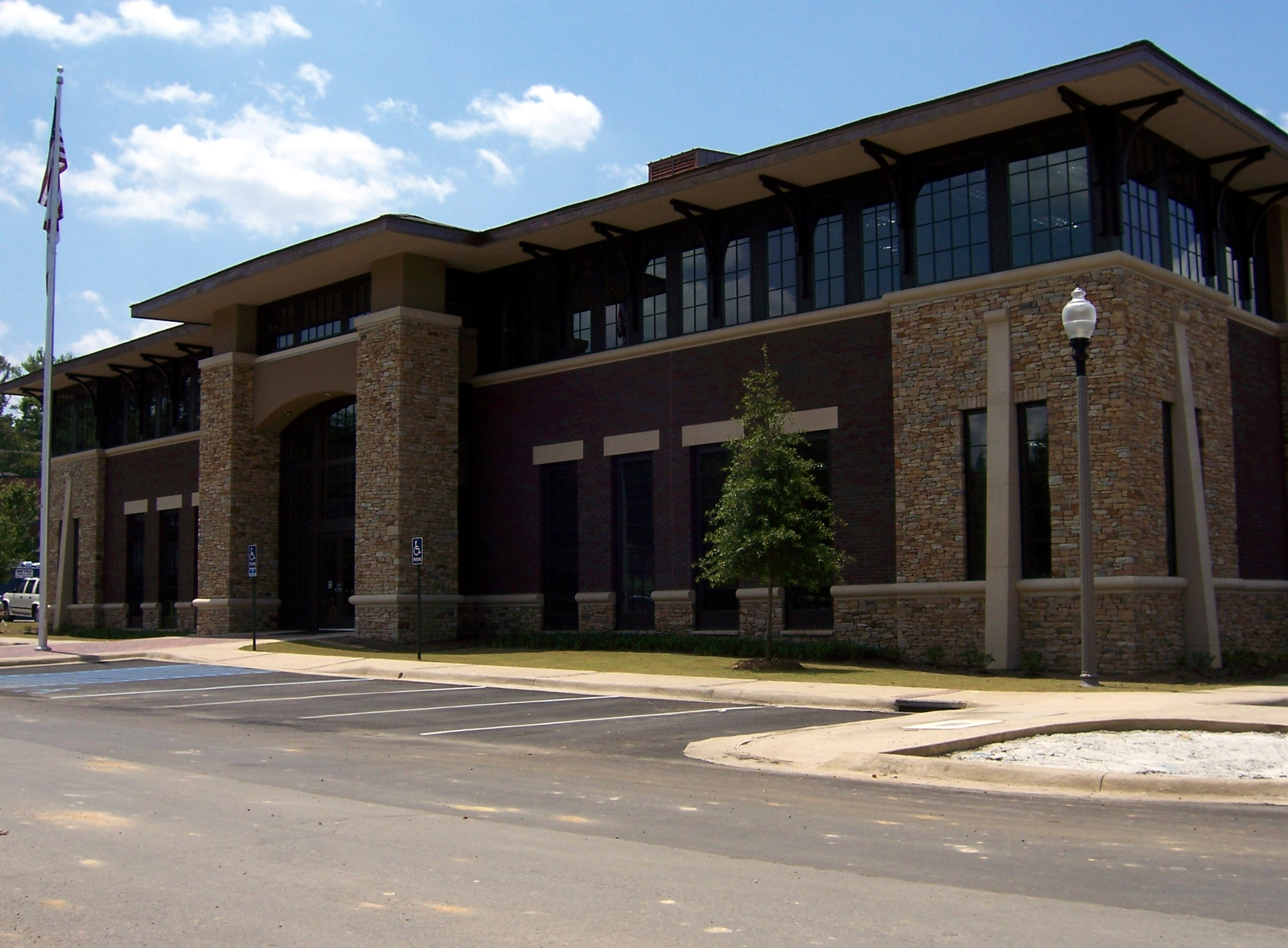
Mountain Brook Board of Education, July 2007

The Mountain Brook Board of Education consists of five members appointed by the Mountain Brook City Council. Each member serves a five-year term, with one seat up for appointment by the Council each year. The Board is currently:

- Anna Comer
- Brad Sklar
- Nicky Barnes (President)
- Jeffrey Brewer (Vice President)
- Jennifer Kimbrough

=== Mountain Brook City Schools Foundation ===

Since 1992, the Mountain Brook School System's funding has been significantly enhanced its own foundation, lessening its dependence on state funds with each passing year. Any funds raised as a result of the foundation's actions are added to a permanent endowment that is used to support any of the school's academic needs.

Since its inception, the foundation's main focus has been in the areas of technology, professional development, and library enhancement. Because of the endowment, the foundation has been able to commit over $5 million in grants to the school system between 1995 and 2013. According to MBCSF, this money was used to complete 55,628 hours of teacher training, purchase in excess of 600 computer workstations, and add 4,500 books to its libraries.

In 2004, the Mountain Brook City Schools Foundation launched its first public campaign since 1996. The idea behind the Aim Higher campaign was to allow anyone in the Mountain Brook Community a chance to "invest in the future of Mountain Brook by investing in the education of its young people." The plan was to ask every family in the school system to contribute at least $1,500 over a three- to five-year period, with donations totaling $2 million, allowing Mountain Brook's endowment to grow to approximately $9 million. With $8.2 million raised, the foundation is nearing its goal.

== Mountain Brook City Schools ==
=== Brookwood Forest Elementary School ===
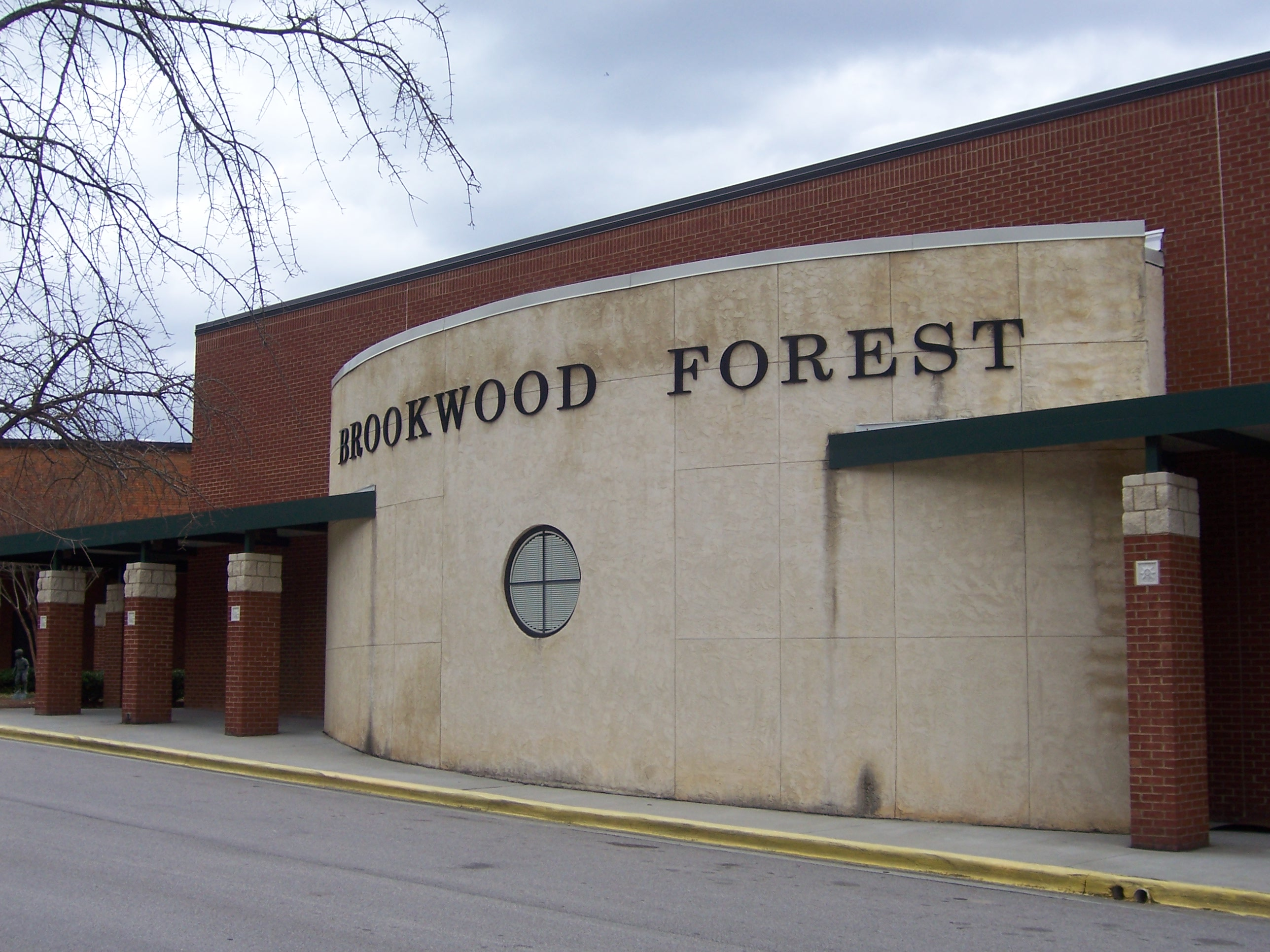
Brookwood Forest Elementary School in 2009

Brookwood Forest Elementary (BWF) is a public elementary school within the Mountain Brook School System. It serves kindergarten through sixth grades and enrolled approximately 530 students during the 2017-2018 school year. Nathan Pitner serves as principal.

=== Cherokee Bend Elementary School ===
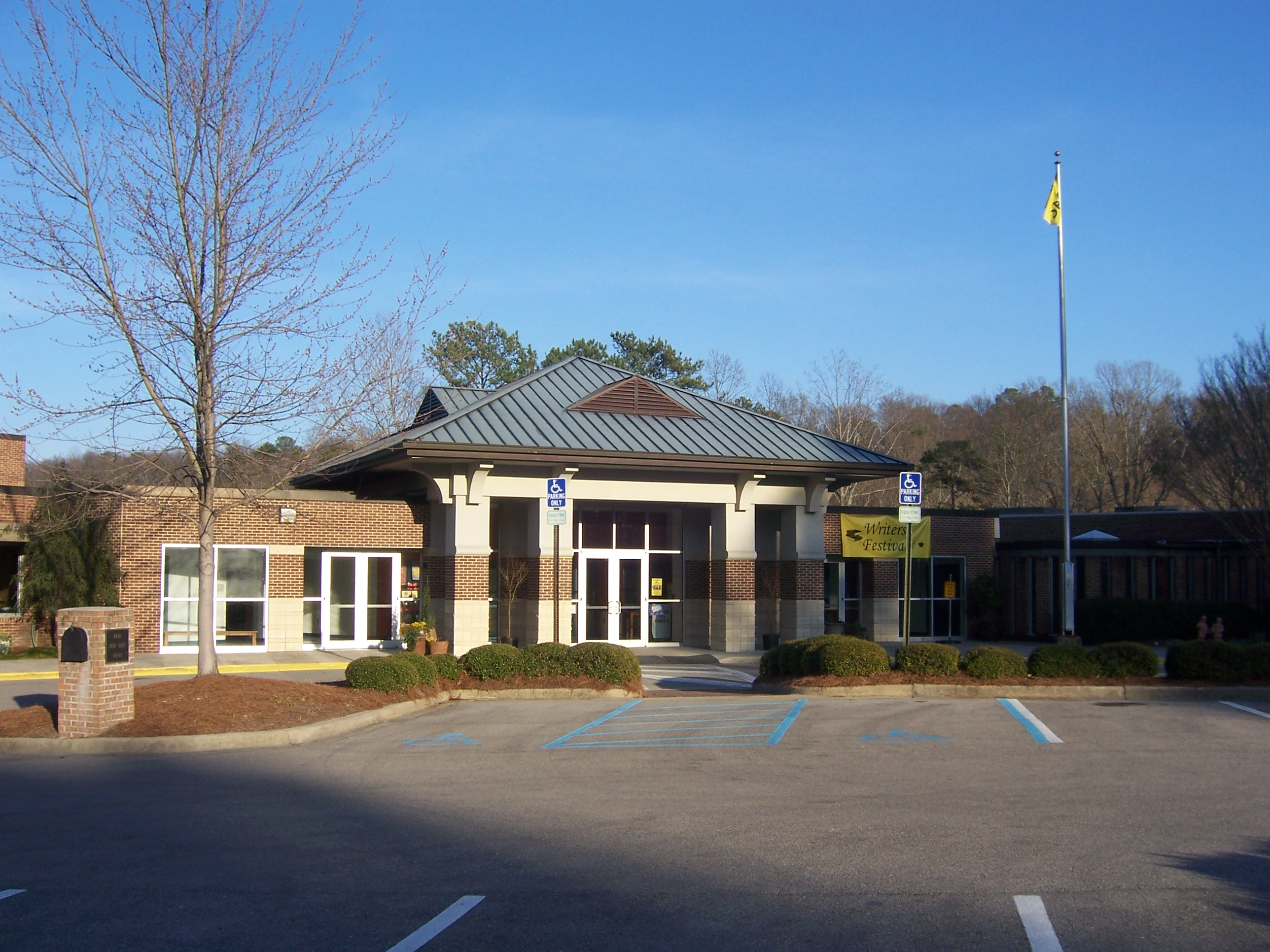
Cherokee Bend Elementary School in 2009

Cherokee Bend Elementary (CBE) is a public elementary school formed in 1969 in the Mountain Brook School system. One of four schools, it serves kindergarten through sixth grade with approximately 524 students enrolled during the 2007-2008 school year. Betsy Bell serves as Principal.

=== Crestline Elementary School ===
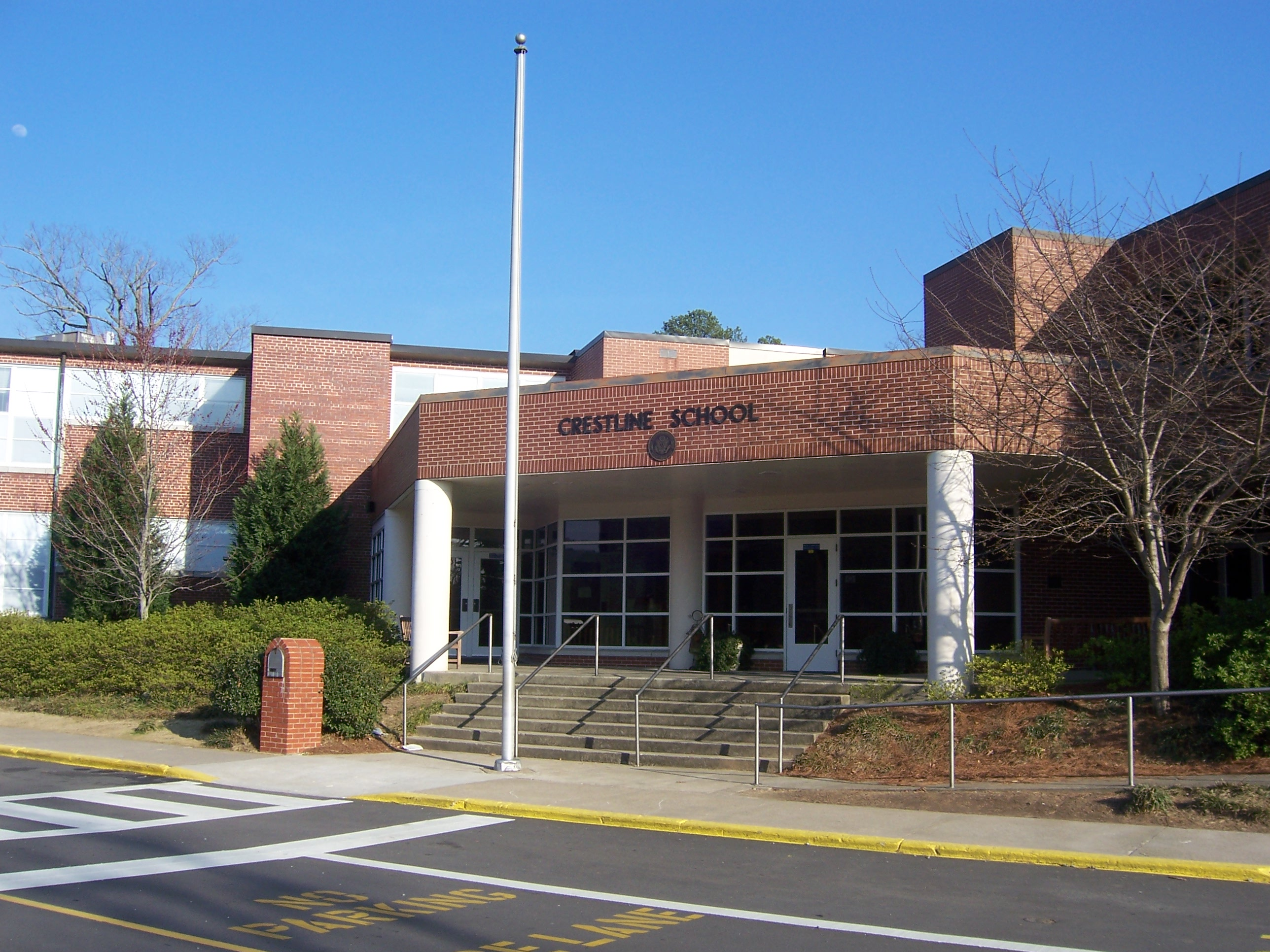
Crestline Elementary School in 2009

Crestline Elementary School (CES) is the largest elementary in the Mountain Brook School System and is home to over 700 students. Accredited in 1973, Crestline Elementary belongs to the Southern Association of Schools and Colleges and serves kindergarten through sixth grades. Christy Christian serves as principal. It was awarded the National Blue Ribbon Award in 2015 under former principal Laurie King.

=== Mountain Brook Elementary School ===
Mountain Brook Elementary (MBE) is located in the heart of Mountain Brook Village. MBE is a public elementary school in the Mountain Brook School System, serving kindergarten through sixth grades with about 550 students. It is the oldest school in the Mountain Brook System. The school was constructed in the 1920s. Mountain Brook Elementary is also a Leader in Me school and has been recognized as a Lighthouse School. Ashley McCombs serves as principal.

=== Mountain Brook Junior High School ===
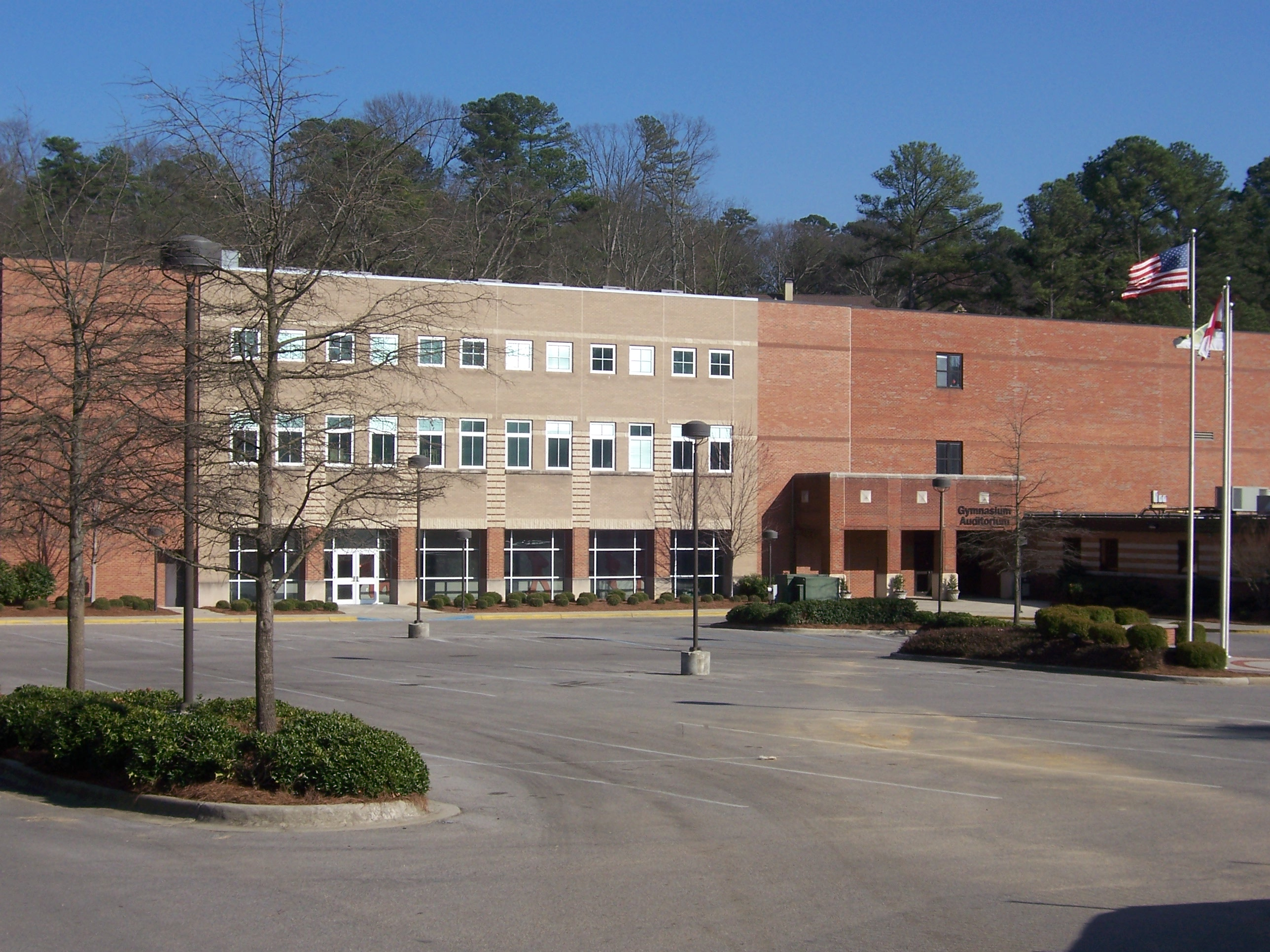
Mountain Brook Junior High School in 2009

Mountain Brook Junior High (MBJH)serves as a public middle school within the Mountain Brook School System. The school contains grades seven through nine and currently has just over 1000 students enrolled. The junior high administration is headed by principal Donald Clayton. The athletic teams wear green and gold and are supported by their mascot, the spartan.

Beginning with the 2014-2015 School year, MBJH started their first year in VEX IQ robotics under the direction of James Salvant. His leadership and direction proved valuable in that MBJH won the Alabama VEX IQ State Championship. That event placed the MBJH team in competition at the VEX World Championships in Louisville KY, the largest educational robotics competition in the world where more than 850 teams from 29 nations gathered at the Kentucky Exposition Center to compete with custom-built robots during three days of intense back-to-back matches.

=== Mountain Brook High School ===
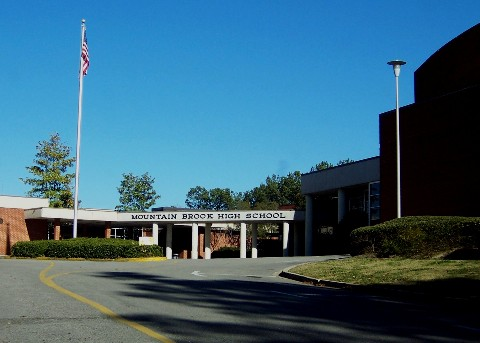
Main entrance to Mountain Brook High School prior to the 2008 renovation

Mountain Brook High School (MBHS) is a three-year public high school serving the Mountain Brook School System. Situated on 25 acres (100,000 m^{2}) of land the school serves grades ten through twelve and enrolled approximately 1004 students during the 2007-2008 school year. The principal is Amanda Hood. The Spartan Arena serves for basketball, volleyball, and wrestling purposes. A new front entrance to the high school was completed in the fall of 2008.

The quality of education is apparent by the many accomplishments of the student body. Currently about 98% of Mountain Brook students go on to colleges and universities in the U.S. Over 500 MBHS students have been named National Merit Finalists, and three Rhodes scholars have graduated from MBHS. College Board's Advanced Placement Program honored MBHS for academic excellence and outstanding support and participation in the AP Program. MBHS has won 122 State Athletic Championships in its 40-year history.
