= Mountain Brook, Alabama =

City in Alabama, United States

- City
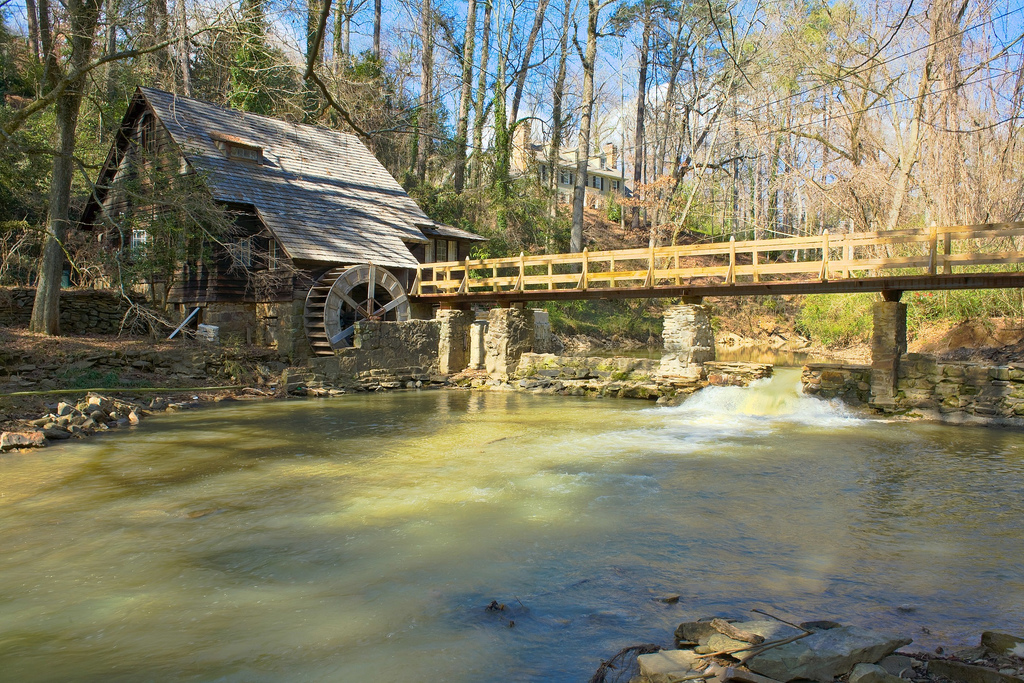
- The "Old Mill" on Shades Creek

- Seal
- Nickname: Home of the Hereford
- Motto: "Find Peace. Find Mountain Brook."
- Location of Mountain Brook in Jefferson County, Alabama.
- Coordinates: 33°29′13″N 86°44′26″W
- Country: United States
- State: Alabama
- County: Jefferson
- Incorporated: March 24, 1942

Government
  - Type: Council-manager

Area
  - Total: 12.84 sq mi (33.25 km^{2})
  - Land: 12.82 sq mi (33.20 km^{2})
  - Water: 0.019 sq mi (0.05 km^{2})
- Elevation: 958 ft (292 m)

Population (2020)
  - Total: 22,461
  - Density: 1,752.0/sq mi (676.47/km^{2})
- Time zone: UTC-6 (CST)
  - Summer (DST): UTC-5 (CDT)
- ZIP codes: 35213, 35223, 35243
- Area codes: 205 & 659
- FIPS code: 01-51696
- GNIS feature ID: 2404329
- Website: http://www.mtnbrook.org/
- Mtn. Brook City Schools @ www.mtnbrook.k12.al.us. — 4 Primary schools, 1 Jr. High School, 1 Sr. High School

Mountain Brook is a city located in southeastern Jefferson County, Alabama, United States, and a suburb of Birmingham. Its population at the 2020 census was 22,461.

== History ==
The city was originally developed in 1929 by real-estate businessman Robert Jemison Jr., as a suburb of Birmingham along the ridges known as Red Mountain and Shades Mountain. It was incorporated on May 24, 1942. The plans, by Boston-based landscape architect Warren H. Manning, called for estate-sized lots along winding scenic roads and denser commercial development centering on three picturesque "villages": English Village, Mountain Brook Village and Crestline Village. Most of Mountain Brook's development preserved the existing trees: 92.03% is under tree cover, one of the highest ratios in the nation. Residential sections such as Cherokee Bend, Brookwood Forest, Overton, and Crestline have houses in a forest setting, with a recreational network of bridle paths. This has protected the area from urban encroachment.

Mountain Brook is the location of the first office park in the U.S., built in 1955. It featured the then novel concepts of ample free parking and low-profile office buildings surrounded by waterspouts and landscaped grounds.

A new city hall, including a fire and police station, was completed in 2013.

== Geography ==
According to the U.S. Census Bureau, it has a total area of 12.82 square miles (33.2 km^{2}), all land.

== Demographics ==
Historical population
Census	Pop.	Note	%±
1950	8,359		—
1960	12,680		51.7%
1970	19,509		53.9%
1980	19,718		1.1%
1990	19,810		0.5%
2000	20,604		4.0%
2010	20,413		−0.9%
2020	22,461		10.0%
2025 (est.)	21,661	▼	−3.6%
U.S. Decennial Census; 2018 Estimate

=== Racial and ethnic composition ===
Mountain Brook city, Alabama – Racial and ethnic composition Note: the US Census treats Hispanic/Latino as an ethnic category. This table excludes Latinos from the racial categories and assigns them to a separate category. Hispanics/Latinos may be of any race.
Race / Ethnicity (NH = Non-Hispanic)	Pop 2000	Pop 2010	Pop 2020	% 2000	% 2010	% 2020
White alone (NH)	20,221	19,692	21,241	98.14%	96.47%	94.57%
Black or African American alone (NH)	62	206	91	0.30%	1.01%	0.41%
Native American or Alaska Native alone (NH)	9	13	10	0.04%	0.06%	0.04%
Asian alone (NH)	134	190	239	0.65%	0.93%	1.06%
Native Hawaiian or Pacific Islander alone (NH)	4	0	0	0.02%	0.00%	0.00%
Other race alone (NH)	15	6	26	0.07%	0.03%	0.12%
Mixed race or Multiracial (NH)	40	108	503	0.19%	0.53%	2.24%
Hispanic or Latino (any race)	119	198	351	0.58%	0.97%	1.56%
Total	20,604	20,413	22,461	100.00%	100.00%	100.00%

=== 2020 census ===
As of the 2020 census, Mountain Brook had a population of 22,461. The median age was 40.5 years. 27.1% of residents were under the age of 18 and 18.2% of residents were 65 years of age or older. For every 100 females there were 93.3 males, and for every 100 females age 18 and over there were 89.4 males age 18 and over.

100.0% of residents lived in urban areas, while 0.0% lived in rural areas.

There were 8,149 households in Mountain Brook, of which 38.0% had children under the age of 18 living in them. Of all households, 70.0% were married-couple households, 9.1% were households with a male householder and no spouse or partner present, and 19.8% were households with a female householder and no spouse or partner present. About 19.7% of all households were made up of individuals and 10.1% had someone living alone who was 65 years of age or older.

There were 8,424 housing units, of which 3.3% were vacant. The homeowner vacancy rate was 0.8% and the rental vacancy rate was 4.7%.

Racial composition as of the 2020 census
Race	Number	Percent
White	21,337	95.0%
Black or African American	96	0.4%
American Indian and Alaska Native	13	0.1%
Asian	242	1.1%
Native Hawaiian and Other Pacific Islander	0	0.0%
Some other race	60	0.3%
Two or more races	713	3.2%
Hispanic or Latino (of any race)	351	1.6%

=== 2010 census ===
As of the census of 2010, there were 20,413 people, 7,731 households, and 5,864 families residing in the city. The population density was 1,673.2 inhabitants per square mile (646.0/km^{2}). There were 8,266 housing units at an average density of 675.8 per square mile (260.9/km^{2}). The racial makeup of the city was 97.2% White, 1.0% Black or African American, 0.1% Native American, 0.9% Asian, 0.0% Pacific Islander, 0.2% from other races, and 0.6% from two or more races. 1.0% of the population were Hispanic or Latino of any race.

There were 7,731 households, out of which 37.7% had children under the age of 18 living with them, 68.2% were married couples living together, 6.4% had a female householder with no husband present, and 24.1% were non-families. 22.0% of all households were made up of individuals, and 9.9% had someone living alone who was 65 years of age or older. The average household size was 2.64 and the average family size was 3.12.

29.3% of the population was under the age of 18, 4.5% was from 18 to 24, 20.8% from 25 to 44, 29.7% from 45 to 64, and 15.7% was 65 years of age or older. The median age was 41.9 years. For every 100 females, there were 89.7 males. For every 100 females age 18 and over, there were 85.4 males.

The median income for a household was $130,721, and the median income for a family was $164,750. Males had a median income of $124,224 versus $54,420 for females. The per capita income for the city was $76,763. 1.8% of families and 3.7% of individuals were below the poverty line, including 2.1% of individuals under 18 and 2.5% of those 65 and over.

According to a list compiled in 2008 by Stephen Higley, it is the ninth wealthiest community in the United States. It is often referred to as "The Tiny Kingdom" due to its high concentration of the region's business and professional leaders, and the disparity of wealth between it and Birmingham where according to census data nearly a quarter of the population lives below the poverty line.

== Government ==
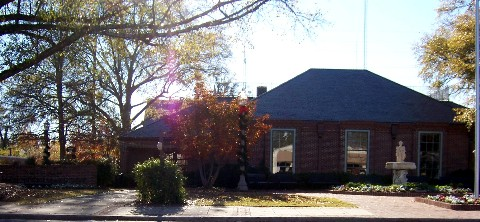
Old City Hall, photographed in 2006

Mountain Brook has a city council/mayor/city manager system of government.

The city council, consisting of five members elected at large, considers most issues and appoints the police chief and fire chief.

The mayor is Graham Smith, elected in 2025.

The city manager is Sam Gaston, appointed by the council and mayor in January 2008.

== Education ==
Schools are part of the Mountain Brook School System and include:

- Brookwood Forest Elementary
- Cherokee Bend Elementary
- Crestline Elementary
- Mountain Brook Elementary
- Mountain Brook Junior High
- Mountain Brook High School

== Notable people ==
- Lou Anders, writer
- Jay Barker, former NFL player
- Nate Bland, former MLB player (Houston Astros)
- Scott Bondy, an American folk/alternative musician. Formerly lead singer of the band Verbena.
- Gregg Carr, orthopedist and former Pittsburgh Steelers football player
- Courteney Cox, actress
- Tommy Dewey, actor (17 Again, The BabyMakers, The Mindy Project)
- Pat DuPré, tennis semi-finalist at Wimbledon in 1979
- Sara Evans, country music singer
- Basil Hirschowitz, gastroenterologist
- Natalee Holloway, murder victim
- Alan Hunter, MTV Veejay
- Kate Jackson, Hollywood actress; star of Charlie's Angels
- David Jaffe, video game designer (God of War, Twisted Metal)
- Doug Jones, former U.S. senator from Alabama
- Don Logan former CEO of Time Warner Inc
- Graeme McFarland, football player (Indiana University)
- Tribble Reese, actor
- Emeel Salem, All-American baseball player at the University of Alabama
- Gordon Sargent, NCAA Individual National Champion Golfer for the Vanderbilt Commodores
- Sarah Simmons, Top 8 finalist on season 4 of The Voice.
- Luther Strange, former U.S. senator from Alabama
- Barret Swatek, Hollywood actress, Republican activist
- William Vlachos, center for the University of Alabama National Championship Team in 2009 and 2011.
- Trendon Watford, NBA basketball player for the Brooklyn Nets

== Cultural references ==
In South and West: From a Notebook, Joan Didion writes, "It is said that the dead center of Birmingham society is the southeast corner of the locker room at the Mountain Brook country club." She adds, "it is hard to make the connection between this Birmingham and that of Bull Connor."

During his 1970 gubernatorial campaign, George Wallace derisively referred to Mountain Brook as "where the rich folks live in the suburbs up across the mountain from Birmingham."

== Transportation ==
Transit service in Mountain Brook is provided by Birmingham-Jefferson County Transit Authority, which operates Max Transit bus service.
