= Emeel Salem =

Free Agent
- Outfielder
- Born: February 11, 1985 (age 41); Birmingham, Alabama
- Bats: Left Throws: Left
- Stats at Baseball Reference

Emeel Badie Salem, Jr. (born February 11, 1985, in Birmingham, Alabama) is an American professional baseball outfielder who is a free agent. He bats and throws left-handed, and primarily plays center field. Salem attended the University of Alabama from 2004 to 2007 and received many awards while playing for the Alabama Crimson Tide baseball team. He was also awarded for his achievements as a student-athlete, including becoming the first college baseball player to win the Lowe's Senior CLASS Award in 2007 after achieving a 3.85 grade point average from his freshman to senior years in college. Salem was drafted as a junior at The University of Alabama in the 10th round of the 2006 Major League Baseball draft by the Baltimore Orioles, but opted to return for his senior year. Following his final season, he was drafted in the 6th round by the Tampa Bay Rays, signing a professional contract in June 2007. He has primarily played center field, however, Salem has played left field, right field and designated hitter.

== Amateur career ==
Salem attended Mountain Brook High School in Mountain Brook, Alabama, and later the University of Alabama. During his freshman season at Alabama, Salem batted .304 with 16 runs, 21 hits, two doubles, one home run, 11 runs batted in (RBIs) and five stolen bases in 41 games. In 2005, Salem's sophomore season, he batted .277 with 31 runs, 56 hits, four doubles, three triples, 14 RBIs, 13 stolen bases and seven caught stealing in 59 games. After the 2005 season, he played collegiate summer baseball with the Cotuit Kettleers of the Cape Cod Baseball League.

On May 1, 2006, during his junior season, Salem won the Louisville Slugger National Player of the Week awarded by Collegiate Baseball Newspaper, and was named Southeastern Conference (SEC) Player of the Week. At the end of the season, Salem was awarded the Southeastern Conference Scholar-Athlete of the Year award as voted upon by the 12 SEC head coaches. As of May 23, 2006. he was double majoring in marketing and Spanish and sustained a 3.9 grade point average. In 2006, Salem was selected as a First-Team ESPN Academic All-American, First-Team All-American (American Baseball Coaches Association), and the First-Team All-SEC team. On the 2006 season, he Salem batted .356 with 67 runs, 101 hits, 14 doubles, seven triples, two home runs, 32 RBIs, and 36 stolen bases. In the 2006 Major League Baseball draft, Salem was drafted by the Baltimore Orioles in the 10th round, but did not sign. On June 13, 2006, Salem and teammate Wade LeBlanc were named to the American Baseball Coaches Association (ABCA) First-Team All-South Region team.

Before his senior season in 2007, Salem was named to the Brooks Wallace Award and Dick Howser Trophy watch list. He was also named a pre-season All-American by the College Baseball Foundation, Rivals.com and the National Collegiate Baseball Writers Association. On his academic success, Salem commented, "I really do take pride in my grades...When a lot of guys go out, I'm in the library studying. So, I definitely make the sacrifices." On his 22^{nd} birth day, Salem hit two home runs in his first two at-bats in a game against Georgia State University. In 2007, Salem was nominated by the University of Alabama for the H. Boyd McWhorter Scholar-Athlete Post-Graduate Scholarship and received the Algernon Sydney Sullivan Award, the highest honor offered by the University of Alabama. He graduated with a 3.85 final grade point average. He later won the H. Boyd McWhorter Scholar-Athlete Post-Graduate Scholarship, which was awarded to him at the annual SEC spring meeting in Destin, Florida, on May 31, 2007. On April 17, 2007, it was announced that Salem, along with 30 other college baseball players, were finalists for the Lowe's Senior CLASS Award. Salem was named to the ESPN the Magazine's First-Team Academic All-American Team, making it his second consecutive season to receive that honor. Salem won the inaugural Lowe's Senior CLASS Award after beating out 29 other finalists. Salem was named to the National Collegiate Baseball Writers Association All-American Team after the 2007 season. On the 2007 season, his final at Alabama, Salem batted .351 with 61 runs, 81 hits, seven doubles, three triples, seven home runs, 32 RBIs, and 23 stolen bases in 57 games.

== Professional career ==
The Tampa Bay Devil Rays (now known as the Tampa Bay Rays) drafted Salem in the 6th round of the 2007 Major League Baseball draft. Salem began his professional career with the Class-A Short-Season Hudson Valley Renegades. With the Renegades, he batted .311 with 41 runs, 70 hits, 11 doubles, seven triples, one home run, 23 runs batted in (RBIs) and 28 stolen bases in 58 games. Salem was tied for second in the New York – Penn League in triples and was third in stolen bases. He was selected to the New York – Penn League Post-Season All-Star team after the season. In 2008, Salem spent the entire season with the Class-A Columbus Catfish. During the month of April, the Tampa Bay Rays named Salem the Player of the Month in their minor league organization. On May 16, 2008, Salem was placed on the disabled list after he broke his elbow from sliding head-first into second base. His injury was season ending and he spent the rest of the season rehabbing at Naimoli Complex in St. Petersburg, Florida. In 38 games, Salem batted .301 with 24 runs, 26 hits, four doubles, three triples, seven RBIs, and 25 stolen bases. Salem began the 2009 season with the Class-A Advanced Charlotte Stone Crabs. On the season, Salem batted .255 with 54 runs, 91 hits, 12 doubles, seven triples, 22 RBIs, and 24 stolen bases in 99 games. He led the team in triples. Salem played the 2010 season with the Double-A Montgomery Biscuits and also spent time with the Triple-A Durham Bulls that same season. In 2010, he batted .260 with 24 doubles, 4 home runs, 23 stolen bases and was named a Southern League mid-season All-Star. Salem missed the entire 2011 season due to a knee injury. He was released by the Tampa Bay Rays in June 2012.

== Other activities ==
Salem led the Pinnacle Baseball Camp, a camp for baseball players in grades kindergarten to eighth grade. Along with Salem, other professional players instructed the camp including second baseman Matt Downs and shortstop Greg Paiml.

== Personal ==
Salem's father, Emeel Salem, Sr., was drafted by the Chicago Cubs out of high school but chose to attend the University of South Alabama where he played baseball under coach Eddie Stanky. Salem is a concert pianist and speaks several different languages. Salem is also related to football players Ed Salem, George Salem, Sr., George Salem, Jr. and Jimbo Salem.
