= Bill Wurtz =

American musician and video producer

- Wurtz's YouTube icon

Background information
- Also known as: Billy Wilds (2009–2010)
- Genres: Jazz pop; progressive pop
- Occupations: Musician; singer-songwriter; video producer; animator; Internet personality
- Instruments: Vocals; piano; keyboards; bass guitar; drums
- Years active: 2002–present
- Website: billwurtz.com

YouTube information
- Channel: billwurtz
- Years active: 2013–present
- Genres: Music video; surreal humor
- Subscribers: 5.54 million
- Views: 801.7 million
- Last updated: September 20, 2026

Bill Wurtz is an American musician, singer-songwriter, video producer, animator, and Internet personality. He is known for his distinctive style of music involving surrealist humor, deadpan delivery and singing, as well as his animated kinetic music videos, which often include surrealist and psychedelic graphics.

Wurtz has been actively publishing music and videos since 2002. He has uploaded videos on Vine, where he first gained popularity, and on YouTube. Two of his animated videos on YouTube, History of Japan (2016), and History of the Entire World, I Guess (2017), went viral and inspired Internet memes. In 2016, Wurtz won the Shorty Award for Best in Weird.

== Career ==
=== Early work and Vine ===
Wurtz's first published composition was an instrumental named "Late Nite Lounge with Loud Lenny", which was recorded on June 17, 2002, and his first song with vocals, "stuck in a rut", was created in March 2005. Beginning in 2010, he released songs more frequently.

Wurtz created his YouTube channel in September 2013. Despite disliking online streaming, he joined YouTube after a friend advised him to post content that was previously exclusive to his website.

Wurtz first became known on the short-form video-sharing website Vine, where he gained a following in 2014. He took short videos he had previously published to his website and edited them to fit Vine's six-second restriction. Before moving to YouTube, Wurtz was uploading a video to Vine nearly every day. In 2015, he received attention for the short video "Shaving My Piano". On April 11, 2016, Wurtz won the Shorty Award for "Tech & Innovation: Weird" at the 8th Shorty Awards. At the awards ceremony, his acceptance speech solely consisted of the words "Thank you." Later that year, Wurtz withdrew from making Vines to focus on finishing History of Japan.

=== History videos ===
Two of Wurtz's most viewed videos are History of Japan and History of the Entire World, I Guess. These are both about history, unlike most of his channel.

==== History of Japan ====
External videos
- history of japan on YouTube

In 2016, Wurtz released History of Japan, a nine-minute YouTube video that outlines Japan's history. The video gave him wider popularity, following an increase in subscribers due to his Vine popularity. Wurtz has stated he chose the topic due to his lack of knowledge of it. According to Wurtz, it took fourteen weeks to make History of Japan. The video covers key events of Japan's history, such as the spread of rice farming, the introduction of Buddhism, internal conflicts between rulers, the Meiji Restoration, its alliance with Britain, World War I, World War II, the atomic bombings of Hiroshima and Nagasaki, and its post-war economic miracle. It showcases Wurtz's visual and comedic style through fast-paced narration and animation—with some topics being mentioned for only one second—intercut with short musical jingles.

History of Japan went viral on social media after its release on February 2, 2016, and received over four million views by February 8. It received considerable attention on Tumblr and Reddit, and became a lasting Internet meme, with people posting quotes and images from it while discussing subjects such as politics. As of September 2026, the video has over 86 million views.

Adario Strange of Mashable described the video as "an entertaining new approach to education". German Lopez of Vox called it a "strange", "pretty good", and "surprisingly funny" video. Owing to the video's short runtime, Lopez noted the poor coverage of Japanese war crimes against Korea and China in the 20th century, while media scholar Sally McLaren noted the absence of indigenous and women's history. In 2021, Polygon listed it in its list of top 25 "dumb internet videos".

==== History of the Entire World, I Guess ====
External videos
- history of the entire world, i guess on YouTube

Wurtz released a 20-minute overview of world history, History of the Entire World, I Guess, on May 10, 2017. The video took over 11 months to produce, including almost three months of research. It briefly covers the topics of the Earth, natural history and human civilization from the Big Bang to the near future. It briefly summarizes the histories of Buddhism, Christianity, and Islam as ideas that suddenly emerged and later became divided. The video marked the continued development of Wurtz's style, with fast-paced, absurdist humor and jazz-like musical interludes.

On the day of its release, History of the Entire World, I Guess was the top video on the YouTube trending page, receiving 3.2 million views. On Reddit, it became the most upvoted YouTube link. It became an Internet meme and was listed eighth on YouTube's list of the top 10 trending videos of the year. The video remained popular for years, and an unofficial version without swearing became popular among teachers. As of September 2026, it has over 184 million views.

Vox's German Lopez praised the video for not heavily focusing on Western history and successfully covering areas that may be neglected in American schools, such as powers in China, Persia, and India. Las Vegas Weekly called it a "must-see", and it has been considered Wurtz's magnum opus.

=== Post–History of the Entire World, I Guess career ===
In 2017, Wurtz released "Hi, I'm Steve", an absurdist animated short about a man who refuses to pay taxes and climbs a mountain, which trended on Reddit. Other popular videos made by Wurtz include animated music videos, such as "Mount St. Helens is about to Blow Up" and "And the Day Goes On", as well as nonsensical shorts.

In 2018, Wurtz appeared on the H3 Podcast, his first major interview. The same year, his song "I Just Did a Bad Thing" inspired a trend of TikTok videos of people lip-syncing to the song and using it to accompany pranks and regrettable changes in personal appearances. Millions of videos used the audio, and #ididabadthing became the platform's top hashtag of March 2019.

After publishing the song "Might Quit" on YouTube in 2019, Wurtz did not post videos to YouTube for nearly two years before returning in 2021 with "Here Comes The Sun", in which he debuted a new 3D animation style that retained his aesthetic. Wurtz produced the 2025 song "I'm a Kid" by Phoebe Katis; it was his first time producing for another artist.

== Style ==
Wurtz creates music and animation in an absurdist, surreal style. Eddie Kim of MEL Magazine wrote that Wurtz "refuses to mimic anyone else's animation or musical style, but it's not weird for weirdness' sake alone", comparing him to Thundercat and Louis Cole and highlighting Wurtz's pretty pop melodies, unexpected chords, and multi-layered rhythms as commonalities. Geoff Carter of Las Vegas Weekly stated, "Merge Don Hertzfeldt, Jenny Holzer and Thundercat and you might get someone a little bit like Bill Wurtz." Film scholars Max Romanowski and Zachary Sheldon described Wurtz's videos as "random", citing him as an example of a YouTube creator whose humor would not have been possible in pre-Internet media.

=== Music ===
Wurtz's music has been classified as jazz pop, incorporating elements of lo-fi music, smooth jazz, funk, and easy listening. In an interview with Genius, Wurtz stated that "it's a good [...] songwriting technique to write about something bad with a good sounding melody, because if you can get people to feel good about something bad, then you're bulletproof in life." Wurtz's voice has been described by MEL Magazine as a "silky tenor with range and energy". He plays instruments including the piano, bass guitar, and drums. His songs feature prominent basslines, which he records on a keyboard rather than a bass guitar.

Wurtz started making music at a very early age. In an interview with Bass Guitar magazine, he said he was "wholly self-taught" as a musician, and he downplayed the importance of music theory in songwriting and composition, saying, "'Theory' may be fun, but it's made of liquid and has a tendency to melt. The music comes first and then you figure out how to describe what happened, although fully describing it can never be done."

Wurtz has mentioned pop singer-songwriter Paul McCartney and jazz fusion musicians Dave Weckl and Chick Corea as songwriting influences. Artists who have expressed admiration for Wurtz's music include indie musicians Daði Freyr and Sidney Gish, as well as DJ and producer Porter Robinson.

=== Videos ===
Wurtz's videos are typically set in a lo-fi, neon aesthetic and have been described as surreal and psychedelic. They feature music, animation, and voice acting by Wurtz himself. They often involve stream-of-consciousness writing, deadpan humor, clip art images, dancing stick figures, vaporwave-like transitions, and neon, sans-serif text on-screen. He said on the H3 Podcast that his aesthetic arose to "get the job done [...] the only way I can do it, really." His aesthetic has been compared to that of the early Internet.

Wurtz's video uploads are more irregular than typical YouTube channels. He is against running advertising on or accepting sponsorships for his videos, despite feeling pressure to do so. He has explained that advertisements make him "uncomfortable" and that he thinks "they suck". Wurtz receives direct fan support through crowdfunding on Patreon, streams on music streaming services, and merchandise sales, but he does not heavily promote these revenue streams.

=== Public image ===
Wurtz has an online following, including a subreddit. He is known as a private person; he infrequently does interviews and has not gone on tour. On the H3 Podcast, he said that he "doesn't have time to do anything but make music". He struggles with perfectionism, making use of schedules and deadlines to overcome it.

== Online presence ==
10.9.18 7:48 pm how the heck are you so gosh darn wacky?
i'm just trying to be reasonable — A question and Wurtz's answer on his website

Wurtz launched his personal website, billwurtz.com, in 2014. Its simple design has been compared to late-1990s websites. The website contains his released songs and most of his videos dating back to 2002, as well as short journal posts and vlog-style reality videos depicting his creative process. Wurtz maintains a section on his website to answer anonymously submitted questions. He originally allowed people to send questions using Ask.fm, but stopped using the website due to his distaste of people having to sign up to ask anonymously. The style of his answers has been described by the website OK Whatever as "[verging] on the poetic" and by MEL Magazine as "earnest, if somewhat loopy-sounding".

Wurtz is active on Instagram and Twitter, with humorous tweets in the style of Weird Twitter.

== Awards ==
Year	Award	Category	Nominee	Result	Ref.
2016	Shorty Awards	Tech & Innovation: Best in Weird	Bill Wurtz	Won	

== Discography ==
=== Music videos ===
Year	Name	Views (millions) (Note: Last updated: November 2026)
2014	"I'm Sad"	0.4
2014	"I'm a Diamond"	1.8
2014	"Barf On Me"	0.1
2014	"Feel Okay"	0.2
2014	"Dance The"	0.2
2014	"Tape Deck"	0.1
2014	"New Canaan"	0.8
2014	"Still Silly"	0.1
2014	"I Like"	0.4
2014	"Tuesday"	0.3
2014	"Icy James"	0.1
2014	"I'm Confused (I Love You)"	1.1
2014	"Blind (To No Avail)"	0.2
2014	"Hey Jodie Foster"	0.1
2015	"I'm Crazy / It's Raining"	1.5
2015	"You're Free to Do Whatever You Want to"	1.9
2015	"School"	11.9
2016	"Alphabet Shuffle"	7.9
2017	"Movie Star"	4.1
2017	"Outside"	6.5
2018	"La De Da De Da De Da De Day Oh"	14.3
2018	"And the Day Goes On"	8.4
2018	"Hello Sexy Pants"	3.5
2018	"Hallelujah"	2.0
2018	"I'm Best Friends with my Own Front Door"	3.3
2018	"Mount St. Helens Is About to Blow Up"	9.2
2018	"The Moon Is Made of Cheese (But I Can't Taste It)"	4.0
2018	"When I Get Older"	2.8
2018	"Long Long Long Journey"	3.7
2018	"Slow Down"	2.6
2018	"Christmas Isn't Real"	2.3
2018	"Just Did a Bad Thing"	9.7
2019	"At the Airport Terminal"	3.4
2019	"Might Quit"	15.0
2021	"Here Comes the Sun"	10.3
2021	"I'm a Princess"	4.3
2021	"Money"	5.2
2021	"More Than a Dream"	2.2
2022	"I'm Scared"	2.5
2022	"Fly Around"	1.4
2022	"9 8 7"	1.2
2022	"At the Corner Store"	1.4
2022	"If the World Doesn't End"	1.1
2022	"I'm a Huge Gamer Most of the Time"	1.7
2022	"The Ground Plane"	0.9
2022	"Meet Me in September"	0.7
2022	"I Like to Wear Soft Clothing (Cause It Makes Me Feel Like I'm Rough in Comparison)"	0.9
2022	"The Ending"	1.3
2022	"Where I've Been"	2.0
2026	"Off the Map"	1.0
2026	"In the Future"	1.4

=== Bandcamp releases ===
Albums
Title	Year
What the Fuck	2010
Church Sessions	2010
The Summertime	2010
Fun Music	2011

EPs
Title	Year
Yikes	2009
The Song Song	2009
Guerilla Myspace Project	2009
Bach Garageband	2010
Burger King Spring	2010
April Flowers	2010
It's All About the Ladies	2010
Fly July	2010
Short Butt Suites	2010
Fall Sprawl	2010
Murder Your Demon	2011
When is it Time to Come Home Again?	2011
Soap Boat	2011
Love	2011
Pain	2011
Hi-Bye (New Shorts)	2013
New School	2014
We Could Just Get Right	2014
Eat Dirt Shorts	2014
My Next Album	2014
High Enough	2014

=== Other songs ===
The following songs are available on Wurtz's website:

Title	Date
"The Song Song"	August 10, 2009
"15 Minutes"	November 28, 2009
"Be Free and Don't Sell Records"	July 8, 2010
"Desk and Chair"	July 15, 2010
"Song 41"	August 26, 2010
"2010"	September 7, 2010
"Eat Bread (Feel Sure)"	September 13, 2010
"The Trees"	October 14, 2010
"I'm About to Graduate from School"	November 7, 2010
"Fever"	November 11, 2010
"Dream of Evil"	November 24, 2010
"Murder Your Demon"	January 14, 2011
"Dumpies"	January 25, 2011
"Blue Boy"	May 22, 2011
"How Am I Spost"	May 22, 2011
"Home Again"	May 23, 2011
"The Stupid Song"	June 1, 2011
"No Place like Home"	June 16, 2011
"Do the Thing"	June 20, 2011
"I Love You"	June 20, 2011
"Go to the Store"	June 24, 2011
"(What) Love Is"	July 11, 2011
"Do What You Want to Do"	July 15, 2011
"All U Need Is Love"	August 2, 2011
"The World"	September 2, 2011
"Home"	September 9, 2011
"I Guess I've Got to Listen to Bob Marley"	September 23, 2011
"Stupid Song"	September 26, 2011
"Textin on my iPhone"	February 12, 2014
"Rabbit Snakes"	February 26, 2014
"The Future Song"	March 5, 2014 (Note: This full-length song does not have a music video but is available on SoundCloud.)
"We Could Just Get High"	March 19, 2014 (Note: This full-length song does not have a music video but is available on at least one of the following: Spotify, iTunes, Pandora, YouTube Music)
"I'm in Bryant Park"	March 26, 2014
"It's Gonna Be Alright"	April 23, 2014
"Write a Song on the Count of 3"	May 28, 2014
"This Is a Song for my Next Album"	June 11, 2014
"Goo Soup"	July 9, 2014
"I Wanna Sail You Away"	July 23, 2014
"All You Gotta Do Is"	August 13, 2014
"I Can Play"	September 3, 2014
"The Road"	September 17, 2014
"In California"	May 30, 2017
"I Love You"	June 6, 2017
"Got to Know What's Going On"	June 20, 2017
