= Spencer Jakab =

Spencer Jakab is an American author and journalist. He is the editor Heard on the Street for The Wall Street Journal. He formerly wrote the Ahead of the Tape column for the Journal and the Lex Column for the Financial Times. Before his career as a journalist, he was an analyst and then a director of emerging markets equity research at Credit Suisse.

== Early life and education ==
Jakab graduated with a BA from Brandeis University in 1991. He has an MA from the School of International and Public Affairs, Columbia University.

== Career ==
Jakab worked as an equity analyst and then director of a research team studying emerging markets at Credit Suisse.

Jakab then began working for The Wall Street Journal where he wrote the Ahead of the Tape column until 2015. He then became the newspaper's deputy editor of the Heard on the Street column in 2015 and then editor in 2019. In February 2025, Jakab was named the paper's investing columnist.

== Awards and honors ==
Jakab's book The Revolution That Wasn't was a finalist for the Best in Business Book Award of the Society for Advancing Business Editing and Writing in the Investing and Personal Finance category.

== Books ==
- The Revolution That Wasn't: GameStop, Reddit and the Fleecing of Small Investors (Portfolio, 2022)
- Heads I Win, Tails I Win: Why Smart Investors Fail and How to Tilt the Odds in Your Favor (Penguin/Portfolio, 2016)
