= Jessamyn Stanley =

American yoga teacher and author

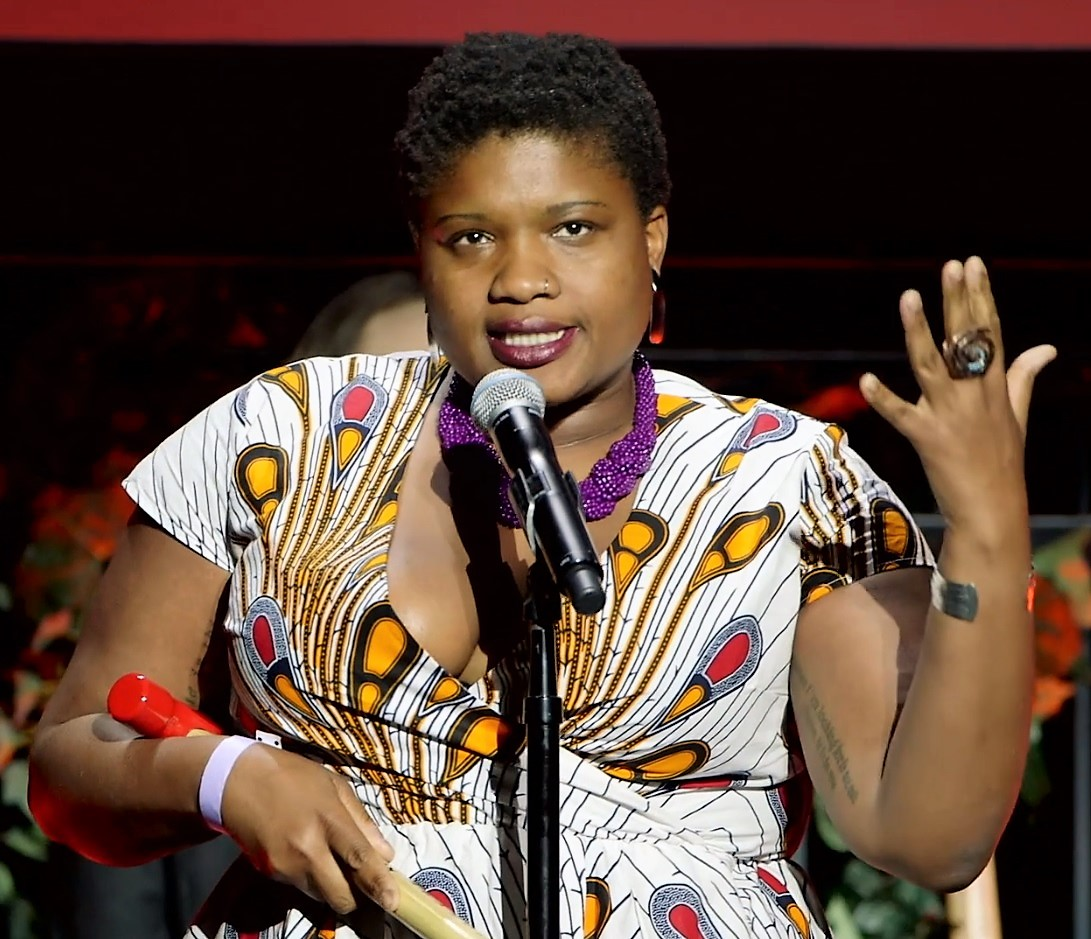
- Stanley receiving 2017 Tribeca Disruptive Innovation award
- Born: June 27, 1987 (age 39)
- Education: UNC Greensboro; The Art Institute of Raleigh - Durham; UNC Chapel Hill
- Occupation: yoga teacher
- Known for: Shorty Award for Best in Healthy Living (2016)
- Notable work: Every Body Yoga (2017)

Jessamyn Stanley is an American yoga teacher and body positivity advocate and writer. She gained recognition through her Instagram posts showing her doing yoga as a "plus-size woman of color," who self-identifies as a "fat femme" and "queer femme." She is the author of the books Every Body Yoga: Let Go of Fear, Get On the Mat, Love Your Body and Yoke: My Yoga of Self Acceptance.

== Early life ==
She is a lifelong resident of North Carolina. In middle school, she dabbled in gymnastics and cheerleading, but her rejection from school teams led her to give up sports for a few years. In high school, she joined the flag football team. She came out as queer at age 16.

== Education ==
Stanley earned a bachelor of arts degree from the University of North Carolina at Greensboro in Media Studies with concentration in video and film production. She also holds an associates degree of applied sciences in culinary arts from The Art Institute of Raleigh - Durham, and a master of fine arts degree in performing arts management from the University of North Carolina at Chapel Hill.

== Career ==
Stanley first tried yoga as a teenager and disliked the experience. She returned to yoga in her twenties as a way of dealing with depression and found that she enjoyed the practice and that it challenged her in ways she found helpful. She began sharing yoga photos to Instagram in 2012 to get feedback about her yoga technique. She has gained a following through her "inclusive, body-affirming" attitude and showing that yoga is not only for "skinny girls." Stanley went through yoga teacher training at the Durham Yoga Company. Her yoga practice philosophy focuses on how the practitioner feels rather than on how they look. She challenges the societal notion that fat-bodied people are "slow and weak," and suggests a change toward a mentality that "strength comes in different shapes and sizes." She teaches yoga classes online, and teaches in-person classes internationally as well as in her home of Durham, North Carolina.

Writing in Yoga Journal, Yelena Alpert describes the effect of Stanley's work as "changing the perception of what a yogi looks like." In an interview with New York Times writer Jenna Wortham in 2017, Stanley spoke of the Internet's capacity for connecting with a large audience that was geographically dispersed, saying: "There was a niche community of people waiting for a yoga book written by a queer, fat, black person. It was just about finding the means to reach them." She had over 200,000 Instagram followers in 2016, and 350,000 by 2018. Stanley's appearance on one of two covers of Yoga Journal in January 2019, the other featuring a slim white woman, provoked a strong response, which in turn produced an apology and explanation from the journal's brand director.

Stanley's social media reach and status as an influencer has led to partnerships with commercial brands including Lane Bryant and Motrin. In 2017 she became the national brand ambassador for U by Kotex Fitness.

== Book ==
Every Body Yoga, published in April 2017, is partially a memoir and a partially a yoga guide. Stanley writes about her personal history with yoga, food, weight, and family, as well as yoga poses, yoga history, and advice for both solo yoga practitioners and those attending yoga classes. She addresses both how to practice yoga, and also addresses ways of overcoming the emotional obstacles that can prevent a person from feeling like they can do yoga. A Booklist review described the book as having a "playful tone and personal, approachable advice." Library Journal called it "uplifting"; Publishers Weekly called it a "touching work" and "a must for those new to yoga, no matter their age or body type." A review in the journal Fat Studies called it "readable and relatable;" it also noted that Stanley talks about the importance of the "underestimated and underrated" practices of breath-work and meditation in yoga, but that the book would have been strengthened by saying more about these topics directly.

== App ==
Stanley created the app The Underbelly, an app for yoga practitioners of all levels.

== Awards ==
- Shorty Award for Best in Healthy Living, 2016
- Fast Company Most Creative People in Business, 2017

== Publications ==
=== Books ===
- Every Body Yoga: Let Go of Fear, Get On the Mat, Love Your Body. New York: Workman, 2017.

=== Articles ===
- "Your Yoga Questions, Answered." The New York Times. July 6, 2016.
- "Find Your Voice." Yoga Journal. January 2019.
