= Threadbanger =

Crafting YouTube channel

YouTube information
- Channel: ThreadBanger
- Years active: 2008-2023
- Genre: DIY
- Subscribers: 3.8 million
- Views: 1.2 billion
- Last updated: 1 July 2025
- Website: www.threadbanger.com

Threadbanger is a defunct American YouTube channel run by Rob Czar and Corinne Leigh producing primarily DIY and crafting content. The channel is known for such series as Man vs. Pin, Corinne vs. Pin, Man vs. House, and the YouTube Red series Do or DIY.

== History ==
Threadbanger launched in 2008. The channel began with content centred around sewing but later shifted to focus on broader DIY series such as Man vs. Pin and Corinne vs. Pin. Threadbanger reached one million subscribers in 2015.

Threadbanger began posting videos as part of the Man vs. House series in late 2017. The series followed Czar and Leigh refurbishing and renovating an older house. Man vs. House was sponsored by Lowe's. In May 2018, Threadbanger launched the YouTube Red series Do or DIY.

In 2019, Czar suffered a cardiac arrest following a heart attack. He was revived and subsequently diagnosed with the autoimmune disease, granulomatosis with polyangiitis. Czar's health issues caused the Threadbanger to take a break from posting videos. Threadbanger returned to posting videos on August 3, 2019, with the video "I DIED....but", which recounted Czar's health issues for the YouTube audience. As of October 2019, Threadbanger had 4 million subscribers.

After recovering, Czar began working seriously on his painting, partly chronicling his art-making on ThreadBanger. In 2022, Czar and Leigh opened an art gallery called the Czart Gallery in West Asheville to display Czar's art.

In 2024, Czar uploaded a YouTube video to his personal channel titled "How-To Ghost Your Audience On Youtube!" in which he indicated that the Threadbanger channel will be no longer updated, saying "That ship has sailed."

On November 15, 2024, Leigh announced she and Czar had officially divorced in July 2024 via her personal Instagram page.

== Awards ==
Czar and Leigh were honorees during the 2009 Webby awards for the How-To, Explainer & DIY category. Along with being the nominees during the 2008, 2009, and 2015 Webbys. During the 2017 Webbys, Threadbanger won the People's Voice category for best web personality.

Year	Award	Category	Result	Ref.
2016	Shorty Awards	Creative and Design: DIY	Won	
