= Tribble Reese =

Television personality, model, and bartender (born 1985)

- Born: Herbert Tribble Reese; July 27, 1985 (age 40); Atlanta, Georgia, U.S.
- Occupations: Television personality; model; bartender; college football player

Tribble Reese (Herbert Tribble Reese; born July 27, 1985) is an American television personality, model, bartender, and ex-college athlete.

== Career ==
Reese is best known for starring in season 2 of Sweet Home Alabama, an eight episode CMT television series, produced by Glassman Media ("Three Wishes"). Reese was also ranked among the top 50 Hot Bachelors of 2008 by Cosmopolitan magazine, where he was named South Carolina's Bachelor of the Year.

Reese grew up in Birmingham, Alabama, and began playing football in 1993. He played football while attending Mountain Brook High School in Mountain Brook, Alabama, a Birmingham suburb, where he was ranked in 2004 as the 15th dual-threat quarterback in the nation by Rivals.com. An ex-college NCAA Division I Big South Conference football quarterback. He was a backup quarterback at Clemson University before transferring and becoming the starting quarterback at Charleston Southern University, another NCAA Division I school based out of South Carolina.

As a back-up quarterback with the Clemson Tigers, Reese roomed with Demayne Board and accumulated two touchdowns and a 62.5 completion percentage in the 2006–2007 season. His transfer to CSU as a fifth-year MBA student placed Reese in the position of the school's first-string quarterback, a move that has expanded his existing game stats to include 21 touchdowns, 1,961 yards passing, and a 133.5 quarterback efficiency rating. Reese also had a stint of arena football in Charlotte, North Carolina with the Carolina Speed in 2009.

Tribble is involved with local charities including Angel Ride in Mobile, Alabama, The Exceptional Foundation in Birmingham and others around the Atlanta area.

Reese stars as himself in the 2013 Bravo Reality Series "The New Atlanta".

Reese played football again in 2014 for the Elmshorn Fighting Pirates – a second division team in Germany. Reese completed 158 of 298 pass attempts through twelve games for 2,483 passing yards and 18 touchdowns. He finished third in the division in passing yards per game (206,9 avg/Game).
