= Nate Bland =

American baseball player (born 1974)

- Pitcher
- Born: December 27, 1974 (age 51); Birmingham, Alabama, U.S.
- Batted: Left Threw: Left

MLB debut
- May 5, 2003, for the Houston Astros

Last MLB appearance
- June 27, 2003, for the Houston Astros

MLB statistics
- Win–loss record: 1–2
- Earned run average: 5.75
- Strikeouts: 18

CPBL statistics
- Win–loss record: 1–2
- Earned run average: 4.78
- Strikeouts: 18
- Stats at Baseball Reference

Teams
- Houston Astros (2003); dmedia T-REX (2008)

Nathan Garrett Bland (born December 27, 1974) is an American former professional baseball pitcher. He played in Major League Baseball for the Houston Astros during the 2003 season.

== Career ==
Bland played high school baseball at Mountain Brook High School in Birmingham, Alabama and was drafted by the Los Angeles Dodgers in the 4th round of the 1993 Major League Baseball draft. He played in the Dodgers system through 1998 before missing the 1999 season with an injury.. He signed with the San Diego Padres for 2000 but was cut at the end of spring training and signed with the Sioux City Explorers of the Independent Northern League. He then played in the farm system of the New York Mets and with the independent Chico Heat of the Western Baseball League before finally making his Major League debut with the Houston Astros in 2003. He appeared in 22 games with the Astros, with a 1–2 record and 5.75 ERA. He later played in the farm systems of the Chicago Cubs and Los Angeles Angels of Anaheim and spent spring training with the Seattle Mariners. He finished up his career in the Mexican League in 2005 and 2007 and played one year in Taiwan in 2008 before retiring.
