= Africa Miranda =

American actress, model and celebrity

- Born: Africa Miranda; Boston, USA
- Occupations: Actress, singer, producer, author, model
- Years active: 2004–present
- Height: 165 cm (5 ft 5 in)
- Website: https://beautybyafricamiranda.com

Africa Miranda is an American actress and social media beauty influencer of Cape Verdean descent. She has produced a number of beauty-related television and social media programs, including Facebook Watch and #TravelFly Solo Weekend.

== Personal life ==
Africa Miranda was born in Boston, Massachusetts, United States. She later grew up in Montgomery, Alabama.

== Career ==
In 2004, Miranda made her film debut in the role of India Piahno in the short film All the Women I've Loved. In 2012, she appeared in the television serial The Game. In that same year, she appeared in the feature film What to Expect When You're Expecting.

In early 2015, she used the live-streaming app Periscope to share beauty tips on the "do's and don'ts" of booking auditions. This channel grew a large following, and Miranda was a finalist in the "Periscoper of the Year" category at the 8th Annual Shorty Awards. Later, in November 2016, she launched her own skincare line "Beauty by Africa Miranda".

She joined Bravo TV's reality television series The New Atlanta, and was subsequently announced as a brand ambassador for Creme of Nature, a hair-care product company. She appeared as a model for the Argan Oil from Morocco campaign and was also the co-creator of the live concept show The Lipstick Junkies and The Hairnista Chronicles.

In 2018, Facebook hired Miranda to create a weekly lifestyle show for Facebook Watch. In 2019, she released the book Step Up, Step Out, And Shine. Around the same time, she collaborated with Parlour magazine for several beauty culture projects. In June 2019, she co-hosted "#TravelFly Solo Weekend" in Morocco for Parlour Magazine. In August 2019, she was invited as a featured guest for "WanderRoam" in Thailand.

== Filmography ==
Year	Film	Role	Genre	Ref.
2004	All the Women I've Loved	India Piahno	Short film	
2006	Nate Washington	Angel	Short film	
2012	The Game	Denise	TV series	
2012	What to Expect When You're Expecting	Adina	Film	
2015	Make Time 4 Love	Sierra McIntosh, producer	TV series	
2022	Archive 81	Mrs. Turner	TV series	
TBD	First Kill	Reporter 1	TV series	
