= Parkietenbos =

Village in Aruba

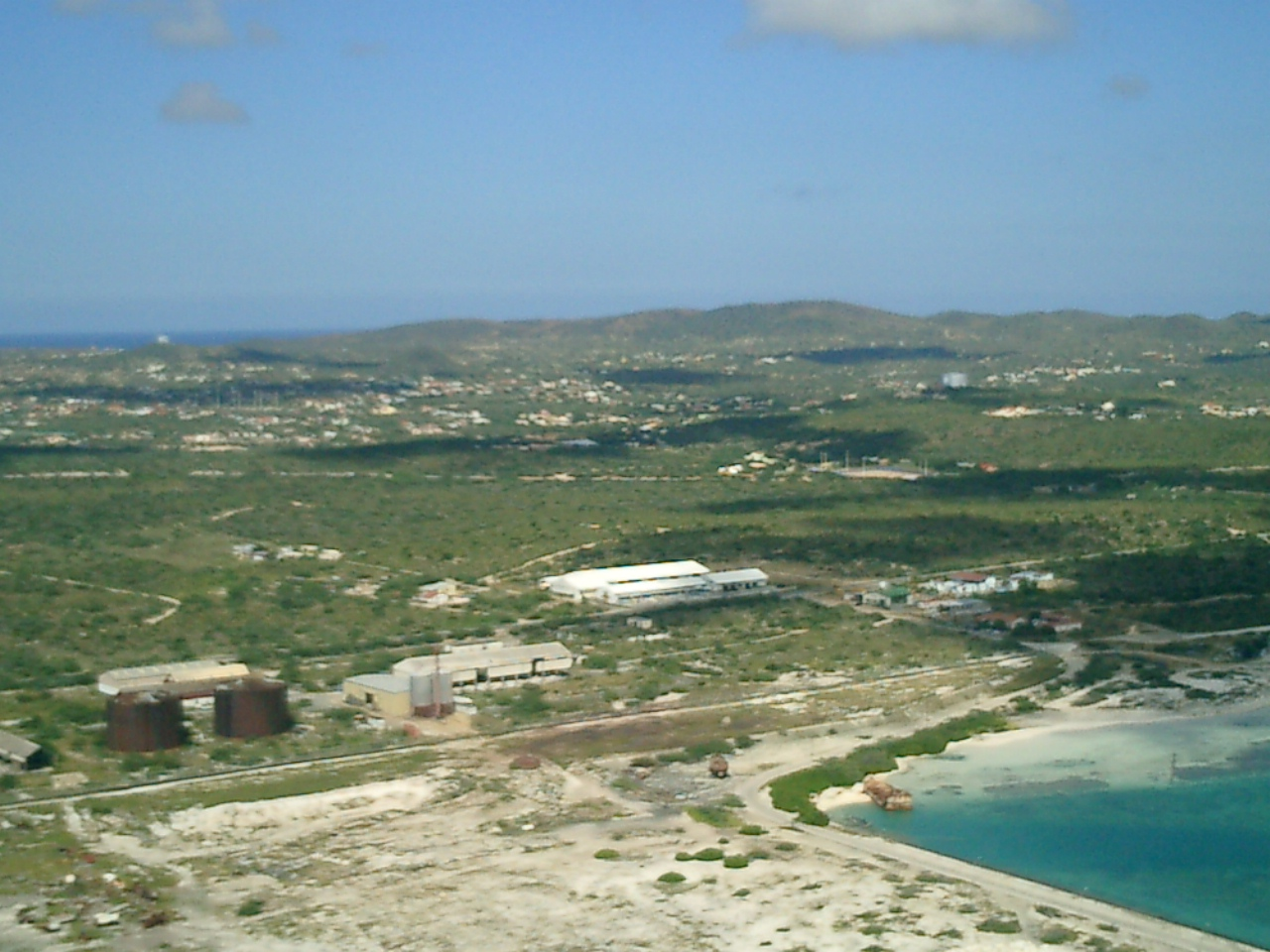
- View of Parkietenbos Landscape

- Location within Aruba
- Coordinates: 12°29′20″N 70°00′23″W
- Country: Netherlands
- Constituent country: Aruba
- Municipality: Oranjestad

Parkietenbos is a coastal village in Aruba near the Queen Beatrix International Airport. This village is also home to the landfill and container site of the island.
