= Aruba =

Country of the Kingdom of the Netherlands

- Constituent country in the Kingdom of the Netherlands
- Country of Aruba; Pais Aruba (Papiamento); Land Aruba (Dutch)
- Flag Coat of arms
- Anthem: "Aruba Dushi Tera" (Papiamento) (English: "Aruba, Sweet Land")
- Royal anthem: "Wilhelmus"
- Location of Aruba (circled in red)
- Sovereign state: Kingdom of the Netherlands
- Before separation: Netherlands Antilles
- Country status: 1 January 1986
- Capital and largest city: Oranjestad; 12°31′7″N 70°2′9″W
- Official languages: Papiamento; Dutch
- Other languages: Spanish, English
- Ethnic groups (2020): Note: Population by nationality; 78.7% Dutch; 6.6% Colombian; 5.5% Venezuelan; 2.8% Dominican; 1.3% Haitian; 5.1% other
- Demonym(s): Aruban; Arubaan, Arubaanse (Dutch)
- Government: Devolved parliamentary representative democracy within a constitutional monarchy
  - Monarch: Willem-Alexander
  - Governor: Alfonso Boekhoudt
  - Prime Minister: Mike Eman
- Legislature: Parliament of Aruba

Area
  - Total: 180 km^{2} (69 sq mi) (189th)
  - Water (%): negligible
- Highest elevation: 188 m (617 ft)

Population
  - 2025 census: 108,880
  - Density: 560.4/km^{2} (1,451.4/sq mi)
- GDP (PPP): 2023 estimate
  - Total: ▲$5.502 billion
  - Per capita: ▲$51,352
- GDP (nominal): 2023 estimate
  - Total: ▲$3.827 billion
  - Per capita: ▲$35,717
- Currency: Aruban florin (ƒ) (AWG)
- Time zone: UTC−04:00 (AST)
- Mains electricity: 127 V/60 Hz
- Driving side: Right
- Calling code: +297
- ISO 3166 code: AW; NL-AW
- Internet TLD: .aw

Aruba, (Note: /əˈruːbə/ ə-ROO-bə; Dutch pronunciation: [aːˈrubaː] or [aːˈrybaː]; Papiamento pronunciation: [aˈruba]) officially the Country of Aruba, (Note: Dutch: Land Aruba; Papiamento: Pais Aruba) is an island constituent country within the Kingdom of the Netherlands, in the southern Caribbean Sea 29 kilometres (18 mi) north of the Venezuelan peninsula of Paraguaná and 80 kilometres (50 mi) north-west of Curaçao. In 1986, Aruba became a constituent country within the Kingdom of the Netherlands and acquired the official name.

Aruba has an area of 179 square kilometres (69.1 sq mi), and measures 32 kilometres (20 mi) in length from its north-western to its south-eastern end and is 10 kilometres (6 mi) across at its widest point. Aruba is geologically located in South America, lying on the South American continental shelf. Alongside Bonaire and Curaçao, Aruba forms part of an island group referred to as the ABC islands. The Dutch Caribbean encompasses the ABC islands along with the other three substantial islands, the SSS islands. In contrast to much of the Caribbean, which experiences humid tropical climates, Aruba has a dry climate with an arid xeric landscape. The relatively warm and sunny weather persists throughout the year.

With a population of 108,880, Aruba is home to about one-third of the total population of the Dutch Caribbean. As one of the four countries in the Kingdom of the Netherlands, alongside the Netherlands, Curaçao and Sint Maarten, Aruba shares Dutch nationality with its citizens. Aruba lacks administrative subdivisions but is divided into eight regions for census purposes with Oranjestad as its capital.

== Etymology ==
The name Aruba most likely came from the Caquetío Oruba which means "well situated island", seeing as it was the Caquetío who were present on the island when Alonso de Ojeda arrived in the 16th century. Between 1529 and the 1648 Treaty of Westphalia, the name "Isla de Oruba" was used for the island by the Spanish. The island was ceded to the Dutch, and gradually its name was changed to Aruba.

There were many different names for Aruba used by other Amerindian groups, all of which could have contributed to the present-day name Aruba. Another Caquetío name for the island was Oibubia which means "Guided island". The Taino name for the island was Arubeira. The Kalinago also had two names for the island: Ora Oubao which means "Shell island" and Oirubae which means "Companion of Curaçao".

A common misconception is that the name "Aruba" came from Oro hubo, (Spanish for "There was gold once"). However, the Spanish declared these islands islas inútiles, meaning "useless islands", due to their apparent lack of mineral wealth. It was not until 1824 that gold was discovered on Aruba by a 12-year-old herder named Willem Rasmijn, leading to the Aruban Gold Rush.

== History ==
=== Pre-ceramic age ===
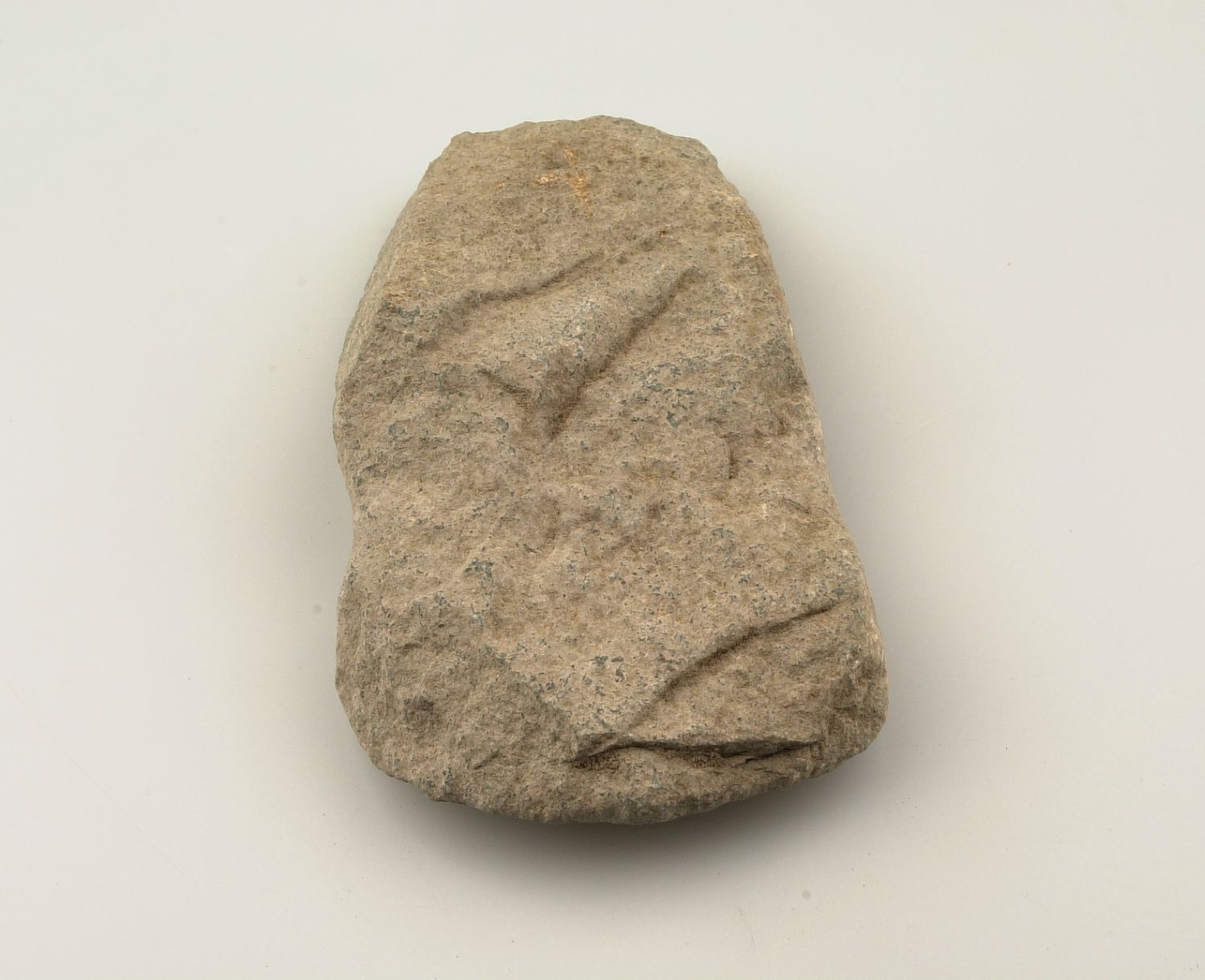
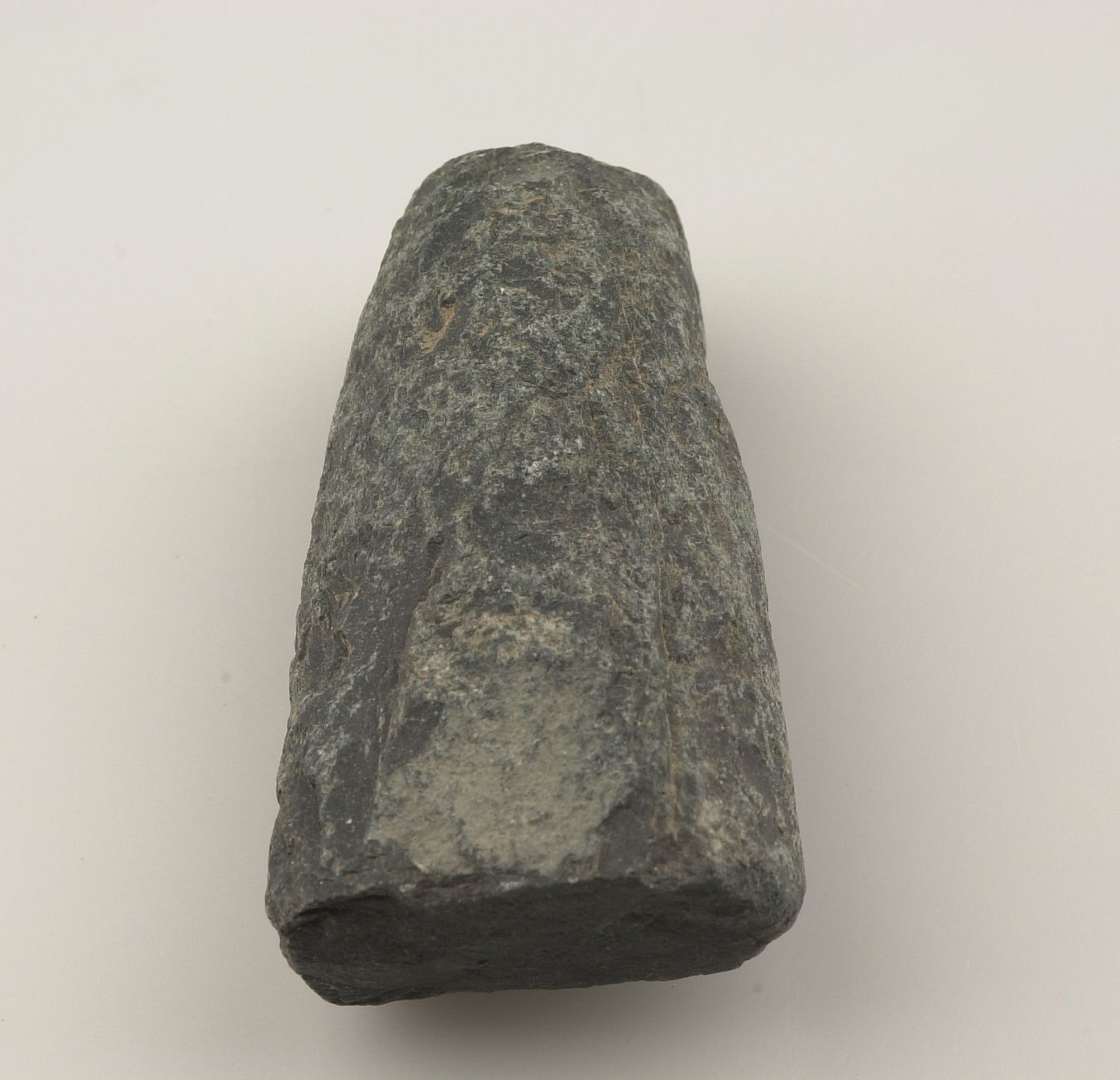
(left) Stone axe blade (right) Stone hand axe

In Aruba's prehistoric era, there were distinct periods: the Archaic or Pre-Ceramic and the Neo-Indian or Ceramic (Dabajuroïd) period. The Archaic occupation of Aruba continued well into the first millennium AD, which is relatively late compared to other parts of the insular Caribbean. The archaic lifestyle revolved around a food economy based on fishing, hunting and gathering, with a strong emphasis on marine resources. Ceramics were absent, as was horticulture and agriculture. Weapons and tools were predominantly crafted from stone. Sharp-edged axe blades, chisels and knives were commonly used, with the knives distinguishable by their elongated shape and flat blades.

One notable site, Sero Muskita, yielded a tool that is older than other archaic age sites on the island. The finishing techniques and shape of this tool resembles one found at Arikok, suggesting a date before approximately 2000 BC. The presence of these tools on the island may be from occasional visits from the mainland. In total, 33 archaic age sites have been identified on Aruba.

==== Early human migration and cultural exchange ====
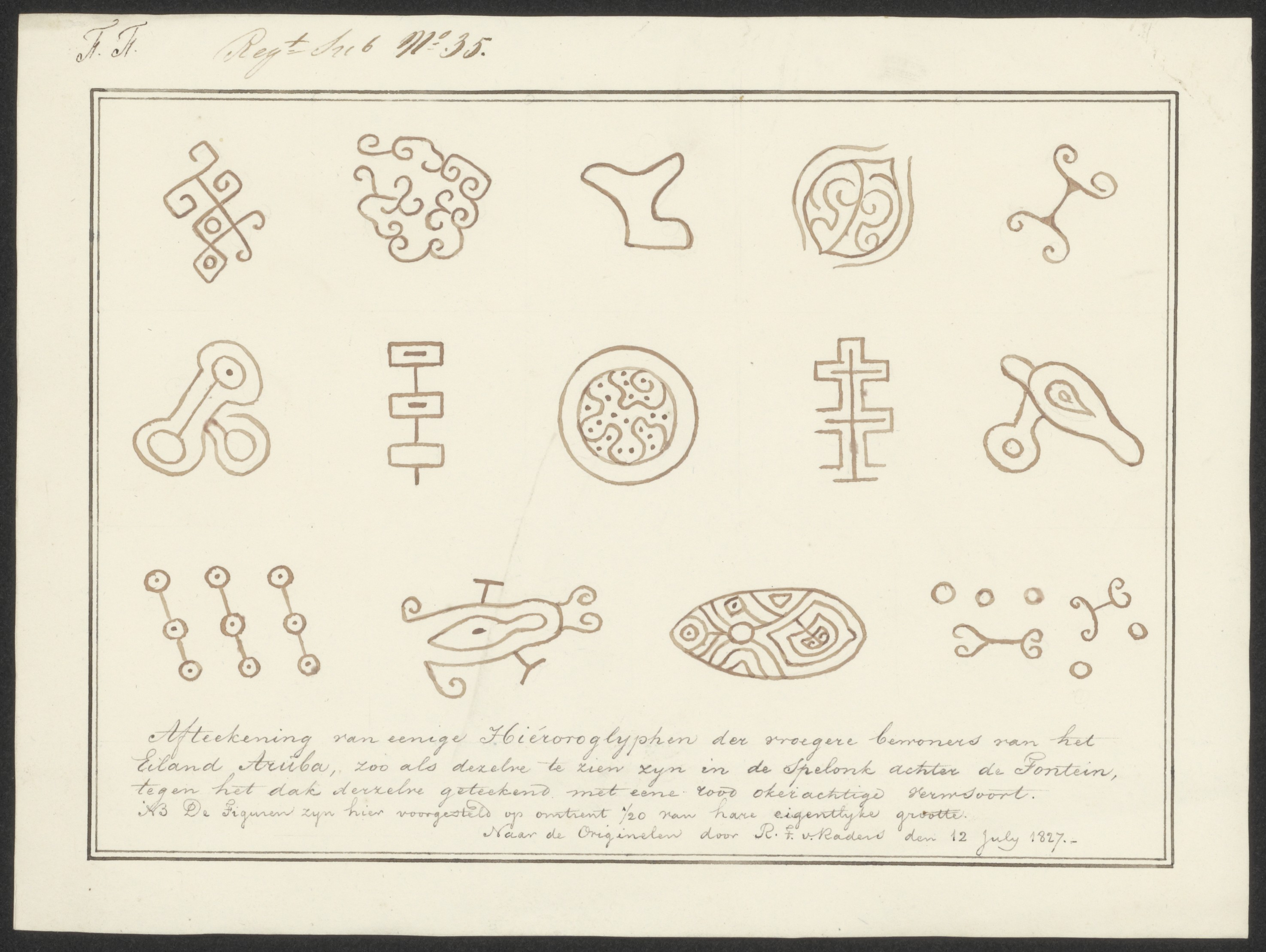
Sketch of hieroglyphs found of earlier presence of former inhabitants, drawn on cave roof with reddish ocre-like paint, ratio 1/20. (1827)

During this period, the Leeward Islands maintained connections and engaged in trade with mainland South America, particularly with partners in the present-day Falcón-Zulia state in Venezuela and possibly the La Guajira Peninsula (Venezuela/Colombia). The specific language group to which they belonged remains uncertain. This theory is supported by the discovery of 60 to 70 Amerindian cemetery burial grounds in Malmok and Canashito. Burial sites at Canashito are dated between 100 BC to 100 AD. isotopic research revealed that one of the individuals buried there was not from Aruba and had a different diet compared to the other four individuals of Aruban origin. This finding suggests that early human migration and cultural exchange were already part of the cultural pattern of these archaic Indigenous people at an early stage.

The burial site in Malmok dates to between 450 and 1000 AD. The Arubans of that time had a short and stocky physique, with adult men averaging 1.57 metres (5 ft 2 in) in height and women averaging 1.49 metres (4 ft 11 in). The burial customs offer insight into the social dynamics of the archaic island inhabitants. Based on the burial patterns, it was deduced that they travelled in clans of 15 to 30 people. These groups were led by an adult man who was buried at the centre of the cluster. His elevated status was emphasised by the presence of several stones marking his grave. The rest of the family group was buried around him.

=== Neo-Indigenous period: the Caquetío ===
The archaic population disappeared from Aruba from the archaeological record around 950 AD, shortly after the arrival of the neo-Indigenous—Caquetío. the Caquetío newcomers possessed a comparatively more sophisticated culture in socio-economic and technological terms; they may have lived alongside the archaic Indigenous people for a time before that population was ultimately displaced or assimilated.

The Caquetío spoke an Arawakan language. The origin of Arawak civilisation (a name based on a linguistic classification) is located in the central Amazon region. Between 1500 and 500 BC, the influence of the Arawaks had expanded to the Caribbean Basin and the Guianas. Between 850 and 1000 AD, the Caquetío migrated from western Venezuela, probably from the Paraguaná and Guajire peninsulas, to the Leeward Antilles. They belonged to the Arawak-Maipure language family. The name Caquetío refers to how this group referred to themselves during their first contact with Europeans. They had longer and narrower skulls than the archaic population, and their height was up to 1.60 metres (5 ft 3 in). The newcomers brought pottery and agriculture to the islands and are therefore classified as part of the neo-Indian period.

==== Caquetío chiefdom ====
The area over which the legendary cacique Manaure exercised his authority was the coastal region of the current state Falcón-Zulia at Venezuela, including the Paraguaná Peninsula, as well as Aruba, Curaçao and Bonaire. The Caquetío people had a highly developed process of state formation. They had a chiefdom, which in human evolution is often a precursor to a kingdom, where central leaders—paramount chiefs—controlled multiple subordinate political-administrative units. Caquetío society was based on political and religious alliances among adjacent communities, rather than military control or the subjugation of neighbouring groups.

At the head of the Caquetío chiefdom was a spiritual leader called diao who had both secular and religious authority in modern terms. He was considered to be endowed with shamanic powers that could influence nature. The diao position was hereditary. By being allowed to marry multiple wives, the diao was able to establish and maintain political alliances with other groups, tribes, or villages. The chiefdom was centralised in its design, but not based on authoritarian or violence-based subjugation. The Spanish conquistadors interrupted this process of expansion at the time of the European contact (AD 1499–1535).

==== Political units and governance ====
The Caquetío territory consisted of several small political units that were under the authority of lower "second-tier chiefs" who were subordinate to the highest authority. How the central authority was exercised over the units is not clear. However, there are reports from the contact period that suggest the diao did not exert his power over the lower units in arbitrary manner. Likely there was a form of consultation between the diao and lower leaders. In the 16th century, two sub-units, the Guaranos and Amuayes, lived on the Paraguaná Peninsula. Aruba, which is less than 30 kilometres away from Paraguaná, was previously connected to one of these units.

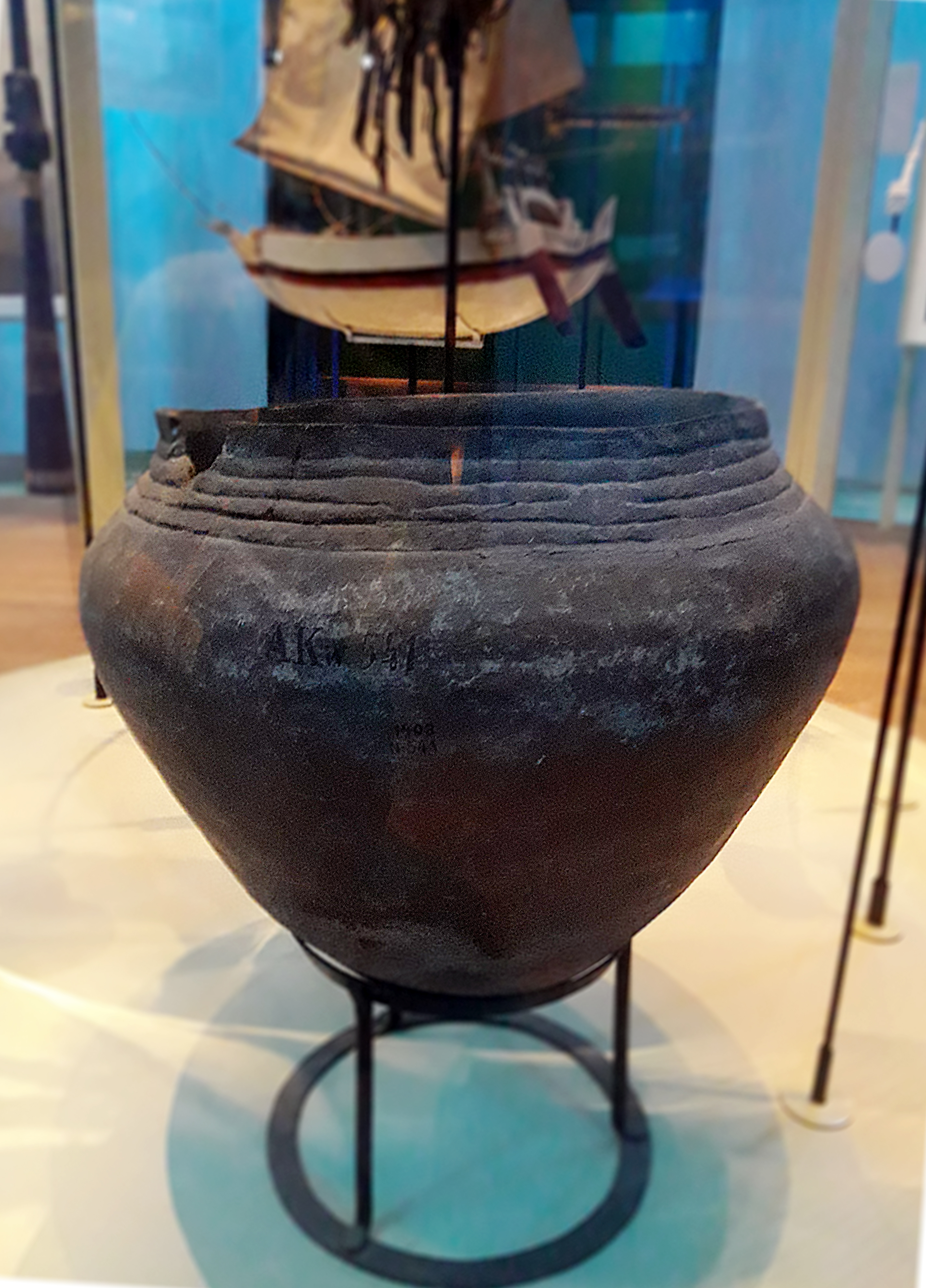
Aruban pot (before 1881). Colonial records often give a one-sided perspective on the indigenous heritage. Original inhabitants of the Caribbean had many languages and cultures. And there was considerable exchange of ideas and produce. — Tropenmuseum

After the diao and the regional sub-units, such as the mentioned Guaranaos an Amuayes in Paraguaná, the village formed the third level of governance in the hierarchy of the chiefdom. Aruba had (not simultaneously) five villages: three larger ones Ceri Noca (Santa Cruz), Tanki Flip (Noord) and Savaneta, and two smaller ones near Tanki Leendert and Parkietenbos, which have not yet been systematically studied. The location of Aruban villages varied. They were situated in places where beneficial agriculture land was available and where the most favourable hydrological conditions prevailed, such as where several rooi (gullies) came together and where relatively much water was available.

==== Agriculture, trade and network ====
The Caquetío people probably used a shifting cultivation farming method, also known as slash-and-burn. The yields from agriculture and fishing were supplemented by engaging in trade of raw materials and artefacts that were not locally available or producible. Sixteenth-century sources indicate that the Caquetíos traded in, among other things, salt, canoes, tobacco and beads. The Leeward Caquetíos certainly did not live in isolation but formed outlying regions of a dynamic chiefdom with regional trading networks.

==== Burial practices ====
In 1882 French explorer Alphonse L. Pinart documented an account provided by an elder Indigenous Aruban. According to the account, witnessed at the former Indigenous encampment at Saboneta (Savaneta), an Indigenous woman was inhumed in one of the large conical ollas. Her body was doubled up inside the vase, with the head protruding through the orifice. Subsequently, a smaller urn was placed upside down on the head, and the entire burial was covered with earth.

The Caquetío people were buried in clusters, both within and potentially outside village boundaries. At times, there was a secondary burial, possibly reserved for exceptional individuals. In the primary burial, the deceased were buried in a large pot, covered with a smaller pot placed on top. In a secondary burial, the body was initially buried without a pot, and after a few months or years, the bones were exhumed and reburied in smaller pots for a second time. Some pots contained grave offerings such as axes, shells and pottery. The secondary burial method was practised until recently in South America. The striking similarity between the Neo-Indian burial practices in Aruba and the post-Columbian variant in Guajira justifies the assumption that the similar beliefs about life after death existed in both societies.

==== Last Indigenous Aruban ====
According to oral tradition, Nicolaas Pyclas is regarded as the last-known Indigenous Aruban. Pyclas spoke and understood the extinct language of the original inhabitants of Aruba, adhering to their way of life and customs. He resided in a hut in Savaneta. His diet included sea snails, such as cocolishi (Cerun uva) and carco (Aliger gigas), as well as wild herbs. Pyclas rejected any involvement in colonial religious practices. Around 1840, he was found dead hanging from a tree branch not far from his hut. Estimated to be approximately 50 years old, he was buried in situ and was not properly buried due to the hard rocky surface, he was only covered with a layer of earth and stones. Pyclas' skull was gifted in the 1880s to the former Rijks Ethnographisch Museum, presently National Museum of Ethnology in Leiden, with the mediation of A.J. van Koolwijk.

=== Spanish period ===
==== Early explorations ====
It is known that Christopher Columbus was not searching for a new continent but for the shortest route to India. India had been the spearhead of European trade expansion and the foreign policy of the Spanish Crown since the travels of Marco Polo a century earlier. India, China and Japan formed the focal point of medieval ideas about boundless riches, cities with houses covered in gold, and islands with inexhaustible amounts of spices, pearls and silk. The suspicion arose that India could be reached via the relatively short route to the west, across the Atlantic Ocean.

During his third voyage to the New World, Columbus was searching for the southern route to India and explored the Paria Peninsula (eastern Venezuela) and the Orinoco region, where he discovered the fresh river water of the Orinoco Delta. The suspicion arose that he had not found islands off the coast of India but a much more extensive land mass; an extension of Asia. Columbus did not realise that this was an unknown continent. Characteristic of his Christian medieval perspective, Columbus solved the puzzle by assuming that he had discovered the earthly paradise. The earthly paradise was inaccessible to humans without God's permission. Columbus experienced the geographical discovery of the New World in Christian terms and assigned himself a special role assigned by a divine power. With the discovery of the Americas the myths of the Golden Age, Atlantis, and the earthly paradise moved from Asia to the New World. He died on 20 May 1506, believing that he had found new islands off the coast of or possibly a peninsula of India—pre-islands: Ant-ilha. These Ant-ilhas were inhabited by peoples whom he called "Indians".

In 1500, Juan de la Cosa drew the first map of the New World, which depicted the two Leeward Antilles known at the time. This was followed by the more accurate Cantino map, created anonymously in 1502, which also showed an extensive landmass and mentioned the Isla do gigante (Island of Giants) and Isla do brasil (Island of Brasil). The location of the Isla do gigante south-west of the Isla do brasil suggest that it refers to Bonaire and Curaçao since Aruba is located more to the north-west.

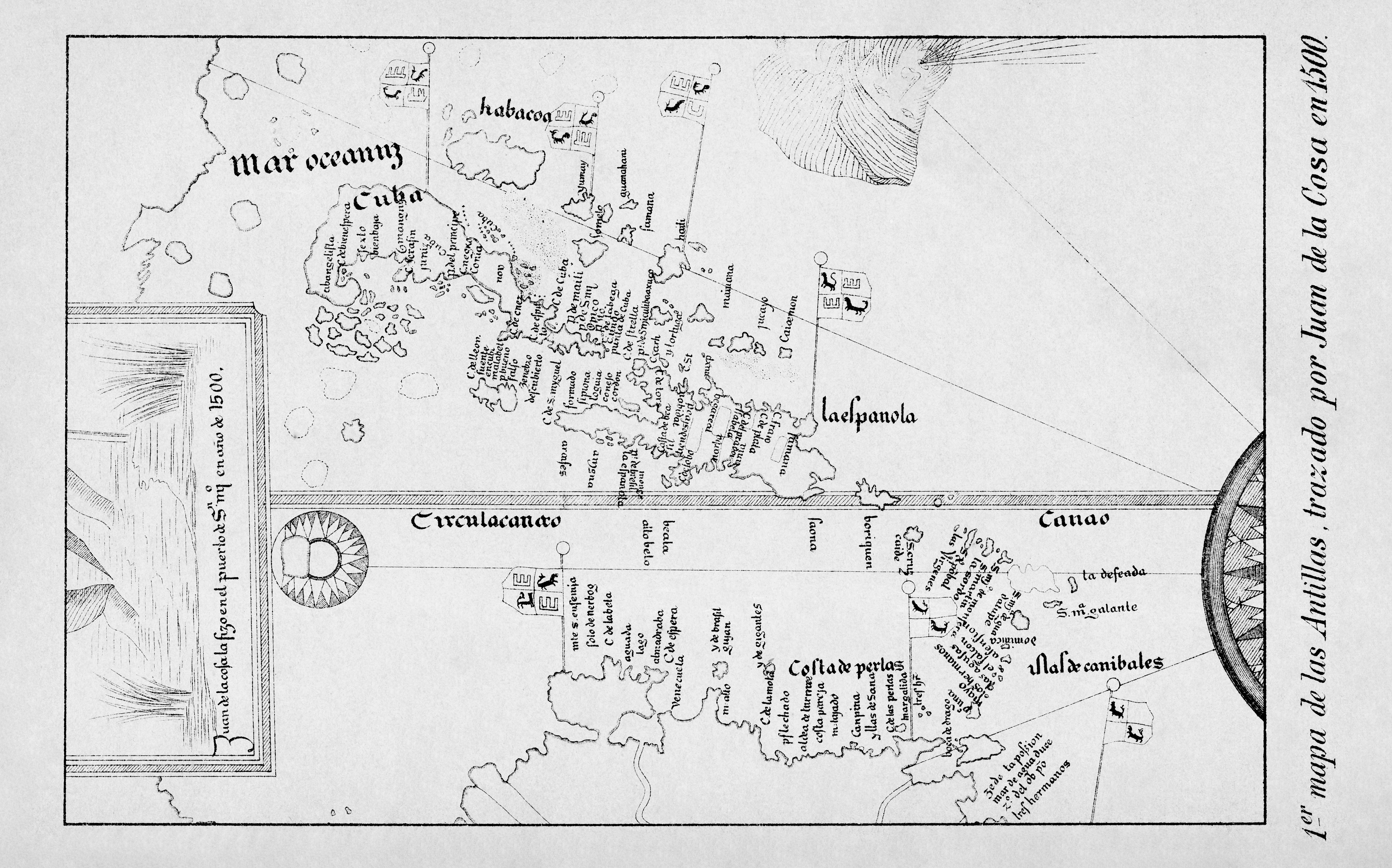
Map of the Antilles, from a portion of the map of Juan de la Cosa (1500)

In 1493, the year in which the West Indian islands became known in Europe, the division between the secular (civil) and religious authorities in the New World had to be arranged. The newly appointed Spanish Pope Alexander VI issued the Inter caetera bull, granting the Spanish Crown sovereignty over the newly discovered territories and the responsibility of the holy task: to send good, God-fearing men, who are learned and capable, to those islands and continents to teach the natives living there about the Catholic faith and instill in them good habits. In exchange for the papal approval of the treaty, Spain promised to vigorously carry out missionary work in the discovered territories. This gave Spain the right to evangelise the Americas and appoint and dismiss priests, blurring the separation between church and state in the region. In other words, the Spanish Crown was granted significant religious authority in the Americas, which was not strictly separate from the state and weakened the distinction between the religious and secular spheres—a key aspect of separation between church and state.

==== Conquistadores ====
Conquistadores were fascinated by legends of inexhaustible gold reserves of El Dorado. The conquest was characterised by bloodshed, destruction, and forced assimilation of the native peoples into European society, such as the initiation of Indian slavery by Columbus in 1492. Europeans had an advantage because they had superior weapons, such as firearms, steel swords, armour, ships, horses, and targeted military strategies. While expedition leaders mostly came from the higher echelons of late medieval society, their foot soldiers were usually from the lower middle class of southern Europe. These soldiers formed the basis of the future group of encomenderos. The encomienda system granted Spanish colonisers right by the Spanish Crown to extract tribute and labour from indigenous peoples. For example, indigenous communities had to give up a portion of the yields from their agricultural or farm land, known as conucos in Taino, (Note: The Papiamento word for agricultural land or farm land, "kunuku" (Aruba: cunucu), may have a Taino origin.) as a form of taxation and to provide for the food supply of the colonists. The defeated were often kidnapped and forced to participate in expeditions elsewhere in the New World as slave labourers.

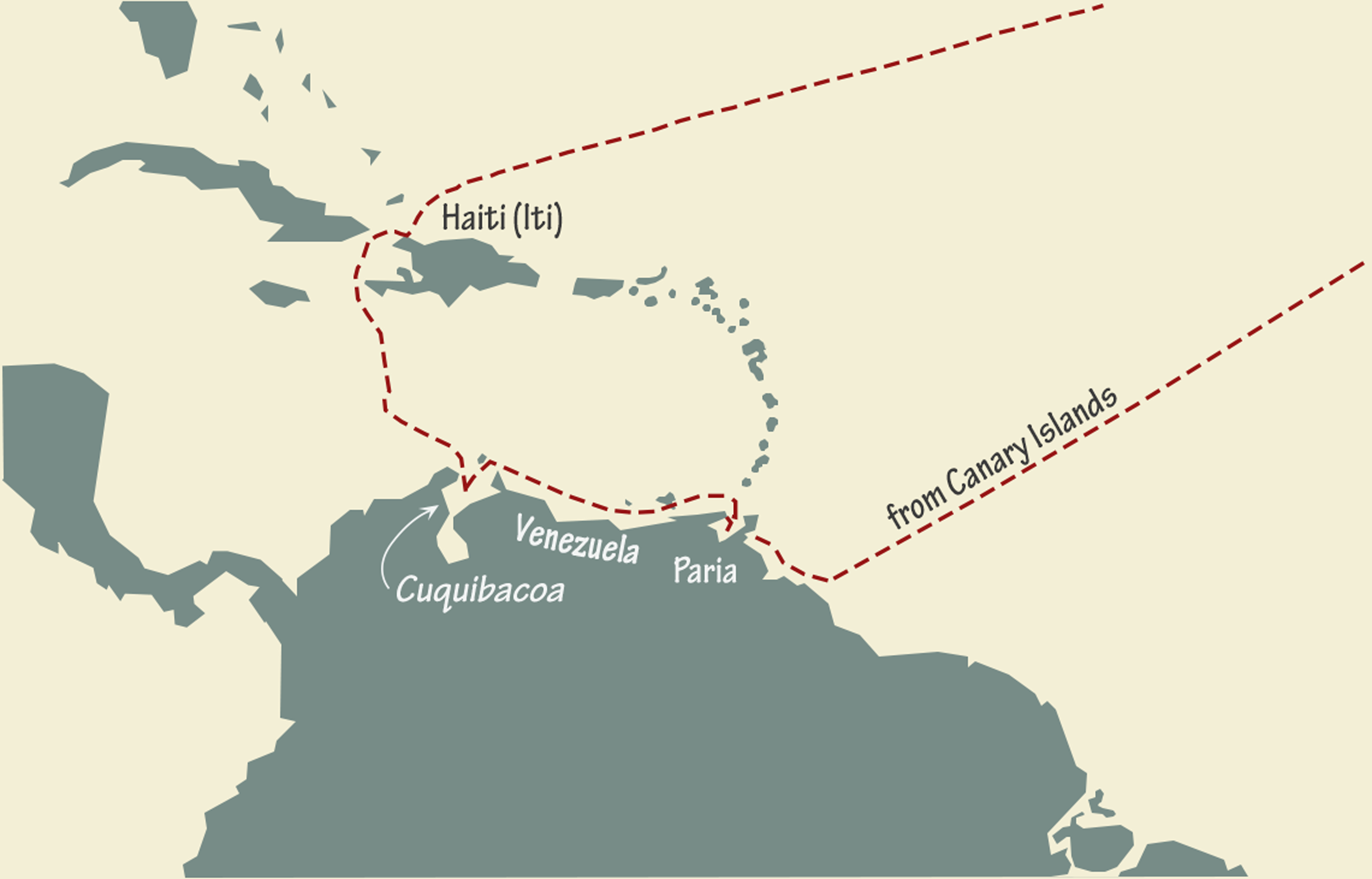
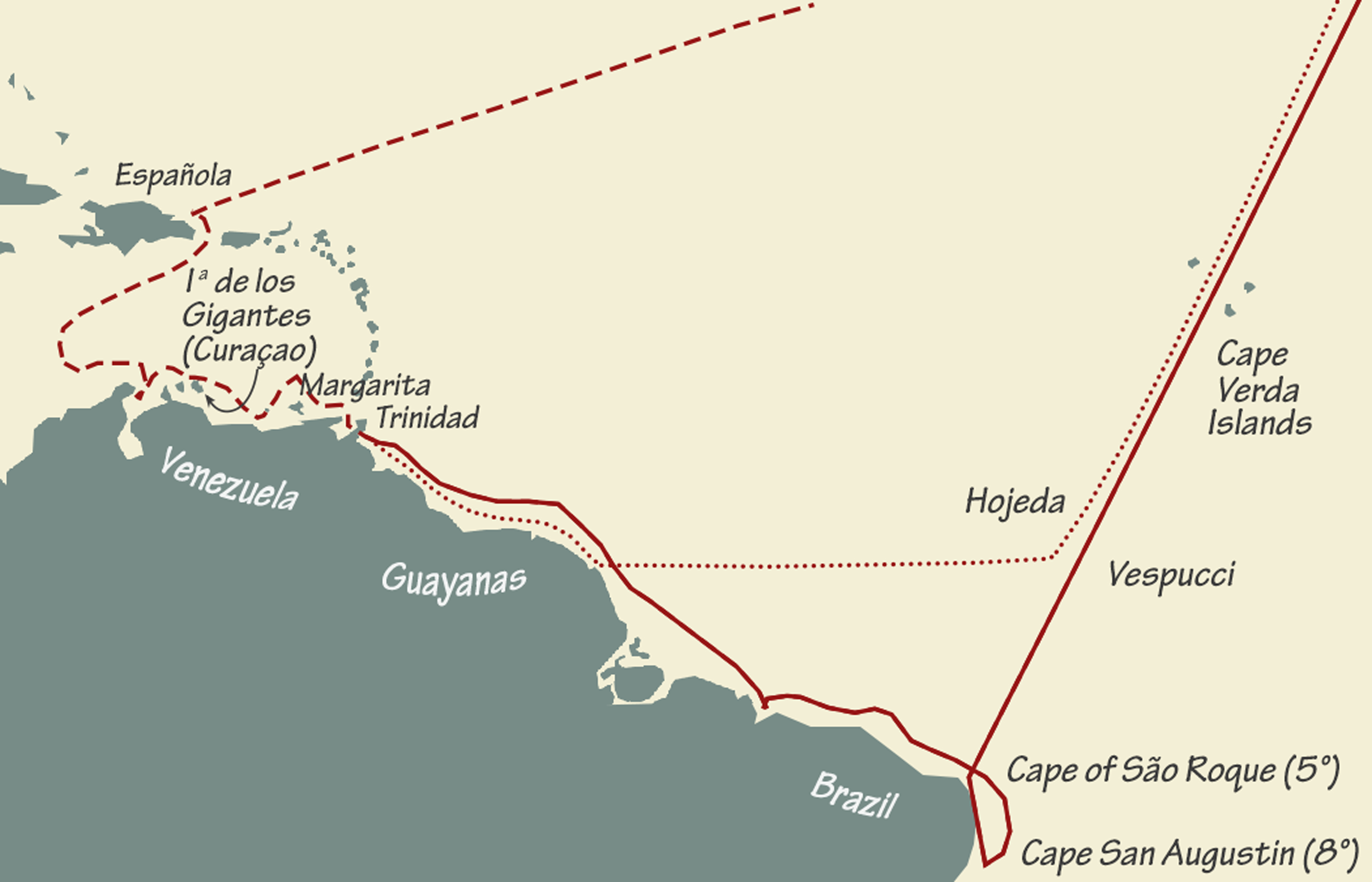
Reconstruction of the first and second voyage of Amerigo Vespucci by Luciano Formisano

The Caquetío population of the Leeward Antilles was incorporated into the Spanish colonial empire c. 1500. On 8 and 10 June 1501, Alonso de Ojeda acquired the exclusive right to exploit the current Venezuelan coastal area, known as Coquivacoa, and the islands of the coast Curaçao, Aruba and Bonaire, and probably also the Mongues and Aves Islands. De Ojeda had to form an administration as far west as possible on the Tierra Firme to secure the Spanish presence. It is believed that de Ojeda and Amerigo Vespucci visited Bonaire and Curaçao, but neither Vespucci nor de Ojeda are thought to have set foot on Aruban soil. He was explicitly forbidden to enslave natives. However, de Ojeda lacked administrative skills and intentions, and he became a controversial figure. De Ojeda established a base named Santa Cruz at the tip of Guajira, from whence he conducted trade and, probably even more importantly, carried out his raids, including slave hunts. During his third voyage to the New World in 1502, de Ojeda visited Curaçao, but his attempt to exploit the region failed. Instead, Bartolomé de las Casas documented de Ojeda's raids, slave hunts and atrocities in the rural areas of present-day Cartagena in his book, Historia General de las Indias. These raids were disastrous, even for the Spaniards, and marked the end of the first attempt to control the region.

Between 1513 and 1515, the Leeward Antilles, including Curaçao, Aruba and Bonaire, were depopulated. Captain Diego Salazar led this effort, which affected an estimated 2,000 indigenous inhabitants from these islands, and likely more from Tierra Firme. Most of the Caquetío were taken to Hispaniola as forced labourers. Many of them likely died on the way or later in the gold mines by the Spanish colonisers or during the devastating smallpox epidemic of 1518. Later on, new Indians migrated from the mainland to Aruba, while Indians were brought to Curaçao by Juan de Ampiés. The indigenous population was under encomienda, which ended the autonomy of Caquetío community in the islands. Their relatives on the mainland did not fare any better. After an unsuccessful attempt by Bartolomé de Las Casas to convert the local population to Christianity, the coastal region of the mainland was leased to the banking firm of the Welsers in 1528. This led to the violent conquest of the Caquetío kingdom. Before 1634, Curaçao, along with its neighbouring islands Bonaire and Aruba, were considered part of the province of Venezuela. They had been separated from Venezuela only during the period of the Welser grant.

The appropriation of the Caribbean region turned out to be a failure for the Spaniards. The exploitation of the West Indian islands proved unprofitable, and gold mining on Hispaniola and Puerto Rico declined. Spanish settlers moved elsewhere, and in 1569, the Spanish Crown banned settlement on the Caribbean islands by royal decree. This measure that did not apply to the leased islands of Curaçao, Aruba and Bonaire. The colonisation of the large Caribbean islands, such as Cuba, was encouraged while the small islands were abandoned. Most of the islands remained largely uncontrolled and undefended, making them a potential opportunity for north-western European countries that wanted to break Spain's monopoly on colonising the New World. England, France, the Netherlands and Denmark explored the possibilities of piracy and trade on the Caribbean islands.

On the continent, the great empires declined, but indigenous societies continued to exist and were exposed to a long process of miscegenation. In the Falcón-Zulia province, among other places, Caquetío societies survived on Tierra Firme, although their cultures and social structures were largely destroyed by the Spaniards. On the (former) Caquetío coastal islands of Aruba, Curaçao and Trinidad, indigenous people lived well into the colonial period. The indigenous history of the Guajira peninsula extends to the present day. The Wayú are increasingly being recognised on the Leeward Antilles as possible contemporary ancestors or lost relatives from prehistoric times.

==== Spanish ranch ====
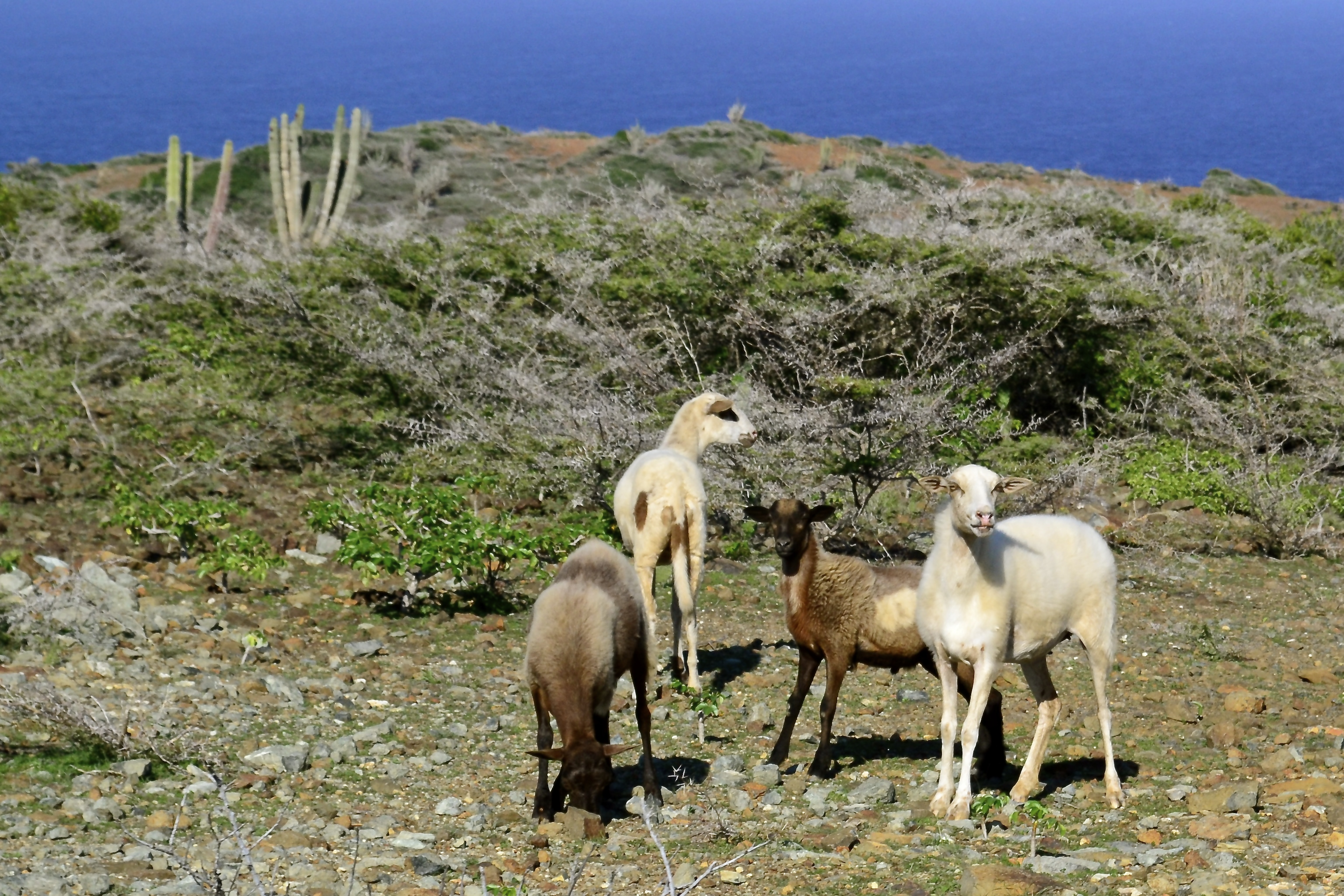
Goats in Arikok National Park

The conquistadors brought European cattle to Aruba. Over time, they also introduced goats, sheep, dogs, donkeys, cows, pigs and possibly even cats. It is believed that rabbits, brought by the Dutch, later became wild on the island. Aruba essentially became a Spanish ranch, with cattle roaming freely in search of food. Despite more trees in the past, the overall vegetation was similar to today. The horses introduced were lighter than Dutch ones, and their hooves became so hard from roaming freely that they did not need horseshoes. To avoid stallions injuring each other during mating battles, horseshoes were impractical. After three weeks of service, particularly in the dry season, the horses were released to recover. Occasionally, a small group of Spaniards would disembark on the island, but typically Aruba was left to fend for itself. According to Dutch geographer Joannes de Laet, by 1630 there were few Indians and some Spaniards on Aruba.

=== Early Dutch period ===
==== Dutch conquest: salt ====
Al is de Sallem schoon, De Haering spant de Kroon.

The salmon may be beautiful, the herring surpasses all.

— E. Az. van Dooregeest & C.A. Posjager (1699)

The Dutch were compelled to venture into forbidden waters of the Caribbean, known as Spain's mare clausum, because of their need for salt, in open defiance of Phillip II. Since the mid-15th century, the prosperous Dutch herring industry had been steadily expanding. The towns of Hoorn, Enkhuizen and Medemblik were particularly active in the salt trade, thanks to their thriving fishing industries. Herring was a crucial commodity for Dutch commerce, requiring salt for preservation. Salt also played a vital role in the butter and cheese industry, as well as in preserving food during long voyages. The curing or pickling process for herring was well established during the Middle Ages. After catching the herring, the packers would remove the internal organs, mix them with salt to create a brine, and pack them in barrels along with additional salt. While Zeeland was not heavily involved in fishing, they were renowned for their salt whitening process, which was highly sought after throughout Europe.

Salt importation began in the 15th century when the Dutch obtained high-quality salt in Setúbal the Portugal coast. This sea salt was good for preserving herring because of its magnesium sulfate and magnesium chloride content. However, the Eighty Years' War prompted Phillip II to halt this trade. With the salt supply cut off, the Dutch were forced to seek new trade routes. Their quest for salt led them to the West Indies. Seeking alternative sources, they turned their attention to Punta de Araya in Tierra Firme by the 17th century. The salt reserves in Punta de Araya were abundant and of high quality, surpassing that of the Iberian peninsula. Rather than being a rock salt deposit, it was a gem salt derived from the clay of the surrounding hills. However, following the truce of twelve years, the Dutch discovered that the Spaniards had fortified the saltpans, forcing them to give up their stake in Araya salt.

After hostilities resumed, the Dutch established the West India Company (WIC) with the main objective of engaging in strategic military actions and privateering organisation against Spain. This was the raison d'être or reason for the existence of the WIC. Their secondary objective was focused on commerce and colonisation, a choice that ultimately led to the downfall of the WIC in 1674. The WIC also gathered information on Spanish treasure fleets. In 1623, the first official fleet of the new WIC, a small squadron of only three ships commanded by Pieter Schouten, set sail for the Caribbean to engage in looting and plundering in the Lesser Antilles and the Yucátan peninsula. It was during this voyage that the Dutch first encountered Aruba.

Around 1628 or 1629, the Dutch started obtaining salt regularly on Tortuga. Governor Francisco Núñez Melián of Venezuela destroyed the saltpans and took some Dutch prisoners, forced them to cut Brazilwood in Curaçao. One of these Dutchmen, Jan Janszoon Otzen, carefully assessed the island's excellent harbour and profitable saltpans, which he later communicated to the WIC. Recognising their struggle for salt, the Dutch realised the need to establish a base in these waters to secure Curaçao. WIC agent Johannes van Walbeeck was appointed as the expedition's commander and future Governor of Curaçao, Bonaire and Aruba. Curaçao was captured and acquired by the WIC in June 1634, primarily by their desire to obtain salt. In Van Walbeeck's report of 1634, Aruba is mentioned only in relation to Curaçao, where he refers to Bonaire and Aruba collectively as the "islands of Curaçao". The Dutch from Curaçao occupied Aruba and Bonaire in 1636.

By 1816, Aruba possessed seven salt pans, all of which yielded salt of subpar quality. The salt production was just sufficient to meet the local demand. Aruban labourers, often assisted by donkeys, were tasked with gathering the salt, which was subsequently distributed among the island's inhabitants. Around 1924, salt extraction at Rancho had limited benefits, primarily being used in the preservation of fish during shipping. Paardenbaai (Horses' Bay) contained salt pans up until 1949 when it was dredged and disappeared beneath the sand.

==== New Netherland ====
Between the Peace of Westphalia in 1648 and the Peace of Nijmegen in 1678, there were 30 years of crisis in the Dutch Antilles and the entire Caribbean region. By 1648, Curaçao had lost its importance as a military outpost. Governor Peter Stuyvesant had a plan to strengthen the connections between the islands and New Netherland. He believed that the two colonies could support each other: New Netherland would provide food in exchange for slaves from Curaçao, horses from Aruba, and salt from Bonaire. But Stuyvesant did not anticipate the rivalry between the two colonies, which prevented them from working together effectively. The Dutch in Curaçao preferred to sell their goods to other Caribbean islands where they could get a better price, rather than trading with their fellow countrymen in New Netherland. Additionally, the islands were involved in illegal trade with the Spanish mainland and did not want to switch to legal trade with New Netherland. Stuyvesant needed slaves to strengthen New Amsterdam's defences, but he mostly received old or sick slaves, called mancarrons, in response to his requests. The better slaves were sold elsewhere to the highest bidder. However, the people in New Netherland were not motivated by unselfish reasons or a strong sense of patriotism. They continued to trade with their French, English and Swedish neighbours across the border. Only in extreme situations did their shared heritage become more important than making money. For example, when the islands faced famine due to a series of dry seasons, Stuyvesant came to the rescue by sending a ship with food just in time.

The troubled relationship between the Curaçao islands and New Netherland came to a sudden end in 1664. At that time, even though a war between England and the United Provinces had not been officially declared, an English fleet led by Richard Nicolls demanded that New Amsterdam surrender. While the Dutch briefly regained control of the colony in 1673, it was once again used as leverage in 1674 to show the English the dangers of their alliance with France. During the 17th century, the Dutch considered England their main adversary, as evidenced by the three wars they fought against the English. The Second Anglo-Dutch War and the subsequent peace treaty in 1667 marked a pivotal moment in Caribbean colonial possessions. Dutch supremacy waned, and the enforcement of English Navigation Acts left a lasting impact on regional trade. Nevertheless, the Caribbean islands eventually regained stability and prosperity, experiencing fewer changes in colonial holdings for centuries to come.

=== Slavery ===
In the 16th century, Spaniards engaged in coercive labour practices, deporting Arawak Indians to Hispaniola in 1515. Colonists exerted control over Indians on the "useless islands", mirroring the hardships of these faced by subsequent African slaves, marked by a denial of freedom and forced labour. After 1775 the names of African slaves began appearing in records, with examples such as "Cecilia" and "Apolinar" tied to families like Silvester and Alvarez from Alto Vista near the coast.

The Dutch coloniser recognised red slavery, particularly of Indians captured in wars. In the Guyanas, Indians taken as prisoners in conflicts were traded, even following peace treaties. Though Indians on Aruba were not officially classified as slaves during the West India Company's rule, oral tradition in Aruba mentioned Amerindian slaves in the early 20th century. Father Paul Brenneker noted their presence in Curaçao as pseudo-slaves. In 1827, Commander Simon Plats found 51 Amerindians treated as pseudo-slaves by Aruban families. Some were brought by shipowners involved in the slave trade. Plats had masters sign a declaration recognising the freedom of the Amerindians, ensuring proper upbringing, education and accommodation.

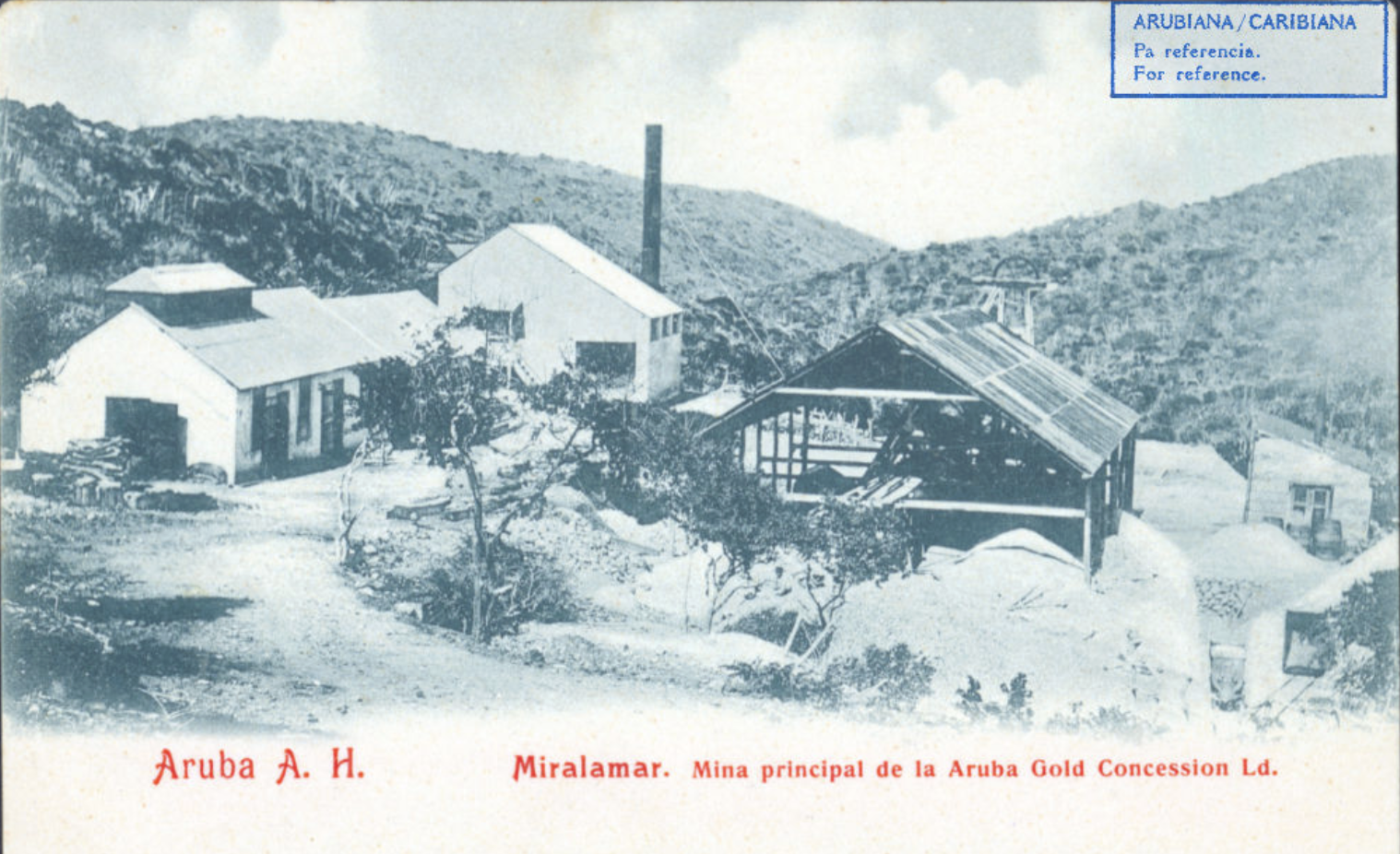
Aruba: Maralamar. Principal mine of the Aruba Gold Concession Ltd. Photo 1903-30

Contrary to common belief, Aruba had a history of slavery, challenging the notion that conditions were considerably better than in other Caribbean regions. Records are limited, with mentions primarily concerning Curaçao in 1750 and 1795. Aruba's circumstances surrounding slavery were comparatively less severe, leading to misconceptions that indigenous people were not enslaved. However, by 1862, 15 per cent of Aruba's population were slaves, with 27 per cent in Bonaire. A Population Report from 1820 indicates 331 slaves in Aruba—157 indigenous people and 174 of African descent. In 1840, the number increased to 497 slaves, with 269 being indigenous people and 228 of African descent. Approximately, half of Aruba's slaves were of indigenous origin, and the other half were of African descent. Although Dutch law generally prohibited the enslavement of indigenous people, the actual practice varied.

==== English interregnum and economic development ====
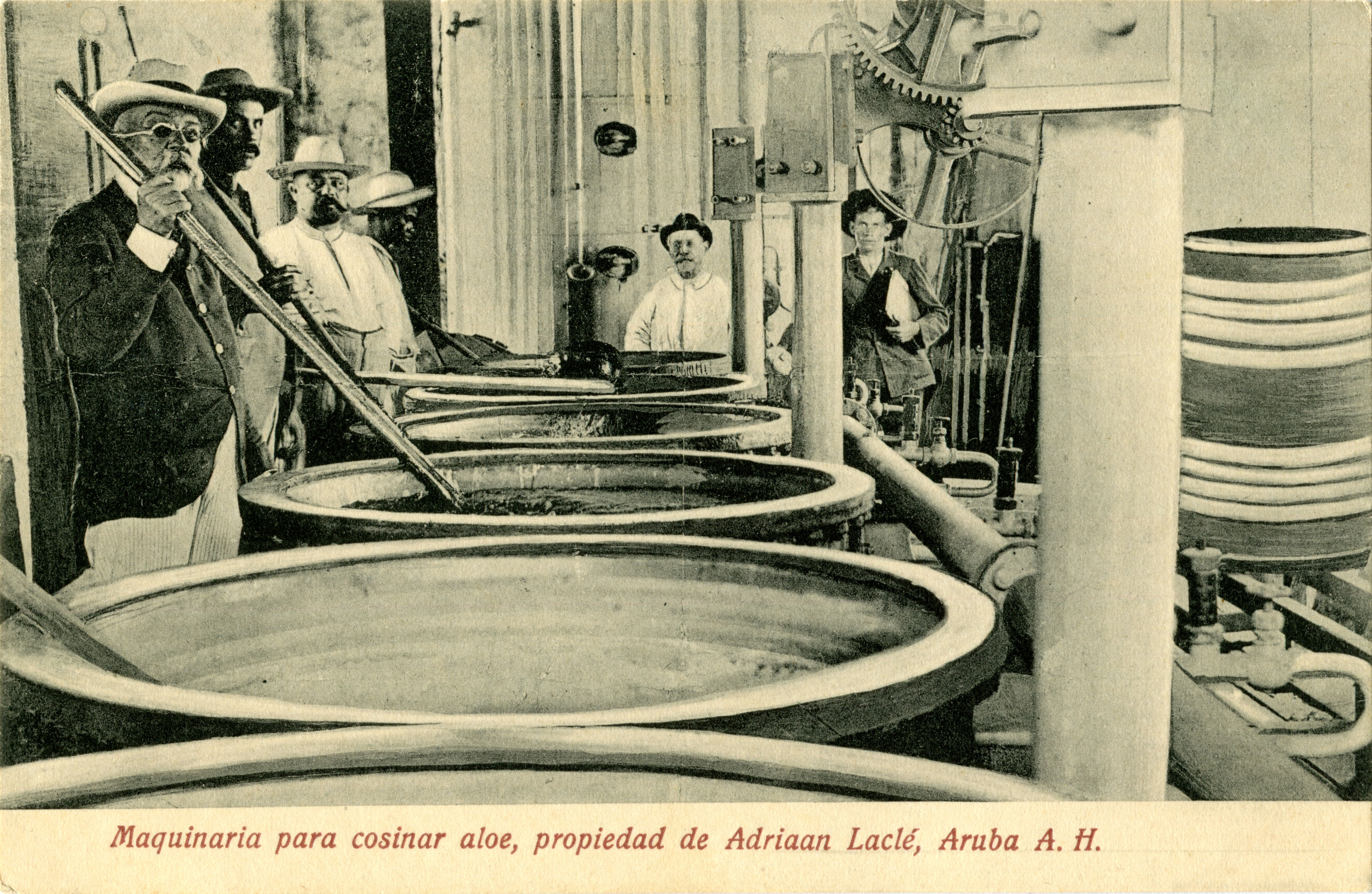
Machinery for the 'cooking' of aloe (1903)

The British Empire took control of the island during the Napoleonic Wars holding it from 1806 to 1816, after which it was returned to Dutch authority in accordance with the Anglo-Dutch Treaty of 1814. Aruba was then integrated into the Colony of Curaçao and Dependencies, along with Bonaire. Throughout the 19th century, the island's economy evolved, centered around gold, phosphate (Aruba Phosphate Company) and the aloe vera industry (Royal Aruba Aloe). However, despite these economic activities, Aruba continued to be a relatively underdeveloped and economically disadvantaged region during this period.

=== 20th and 21st centuries ===
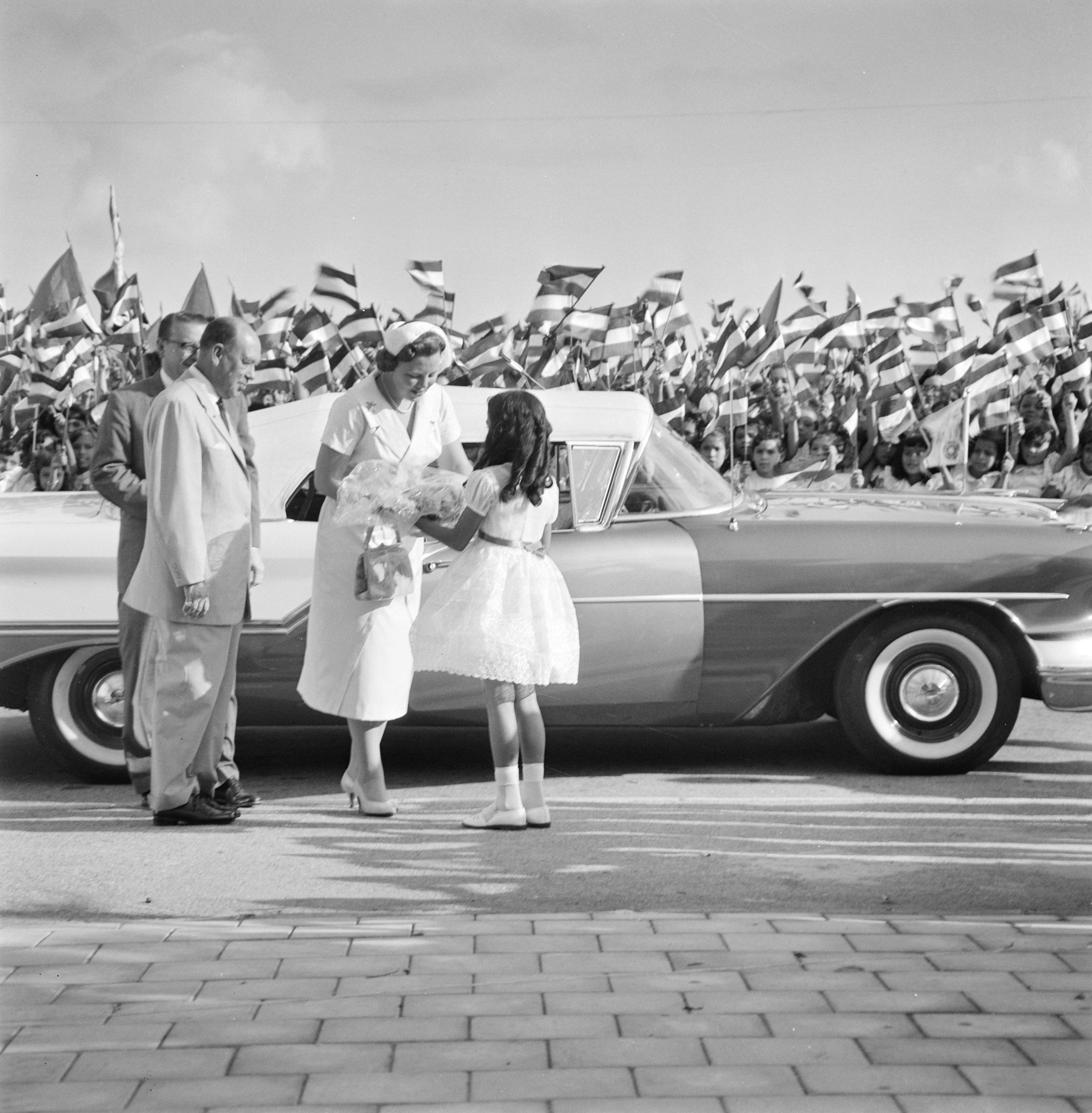
Princess Beatrix in Aruba, 1958

The first oil refinery, Lago Oil and Transport Company, in San Nicolaas was built in 1924 and a subsidiary of Standard Oil. The refinery on Aruba grew to become one of the largest in the world. In 1927, the Arend Petroleum Company was established to the west of Oranjestad. The refineries processed crude oil from the vast Venezuelan oil fields, bringing greater prosperity to the island.

During World War II, the Netherlands was occupied by Nazi Germany. In 1940, the oil facilities in Aruba came under the administration of the Dutch government-in-exile in London, causing them to be attacked by the German navy in 1942.

In August 1947, Aruba formulated its first staatsreglement (constitution) for Aruba's status aparte as an autonomous state within the Kingdom of the Netherlands, prompted by the efforts of Henny Eman, a noted Aruban politician. By 1954, the Charter of the Kingdom of the Netherlands was established, providing a framework for relations between Aruba and the rest of the kingdom. That created the Netherlands Antilles, which united all of the Dutch colonies in the Caribbean into one administrative structure. Many Arubans were unhappy with the arrangement, however, as the polity was perceived as being dominated by Curaçao.

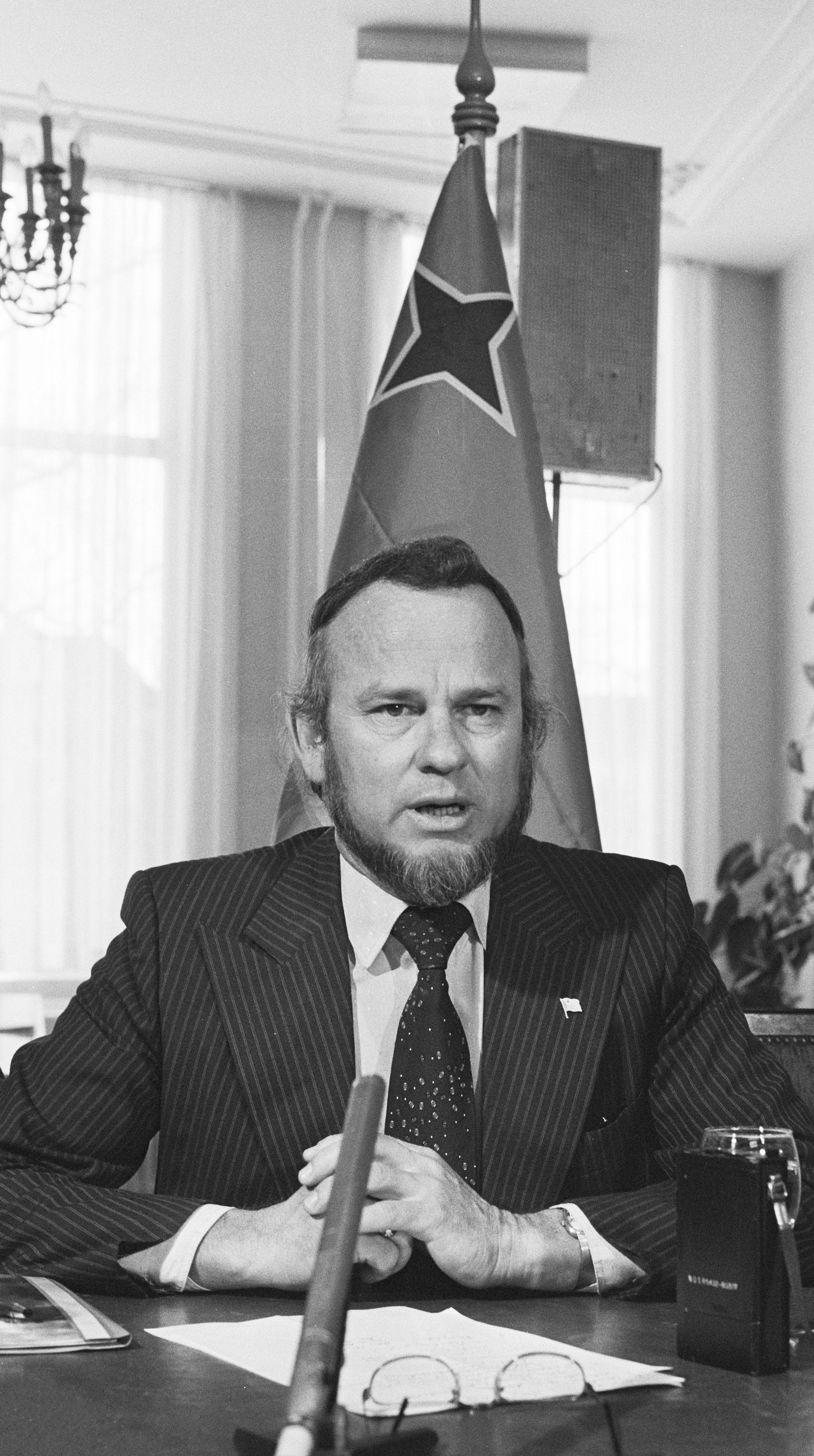
Betico Croes, a pivotal figure in Aruba's drive for greater autonomy in the 1970s–80s

In 1972, at a conference in Suriname, Aruban politician Betico Croes proposed the creation of a Dutch Commonwealth of four states: Aruba, the Netherlands, Suriname and the Netherlands Antilles, each to have its own nationality. Backed by his newly created party, the Movimiento Electoral di Pueblo, Croes sought greater autonomy for Aruba, with the long-term goal of independence, adopting the trappings of an independent state in 1976 with the creation of a flag and national anthem. In March 1977, a referendum was held with the support of the United Nations. 82% of the participants voted for complete independence from the Netherlands. Tensions mounted as Croes stepped up the pressure on the Dutch government by organising a general strike in 1977. Croes later met with Dutch Prime Minister Joop den Uyl, with the two sides agreeing to assign the Institute of Social Studies in The Hague to prepare a study for independence, entitled Aruba en Onafhankelijkheid, achtergronden, modaliteiten, en mogelijkheden; een rapport in eerste aanleg (Aruba and independence, backgrounds, modalities, and opportunities; a preliminary report) (1978).

=== Autonomy ===
In March 1983 Aruba reached an official agreement within the kingdom for its independence, to be developed in a series of steps as the Crown granted increasing autonomy. In August 1985, Aruba drafted a constitution that was unanimously approved. On 1 January 1986, after the 1985 general election was held for its first parliament, Aruba seceded from the Netherlands Antilles, officially becoming a country of the Kingdom of the Netherlands, with full independence planned for 1996. Croes was seriously injured in a traffic accident in 1985, slipping into a coma. He died in 1986, never seeing the enacting of status aparte for Aruba for which he had worked over many years. After his death, Croes was proclaimed Libertador di Aruba (Liberator of Aruba). Croes' successor, Henny Eman of the Aruban People's Party, became the first Prime Minister of Aruba.

Meanwhile, in 1985, Aruba's oil refinery closed. It had provided Aruba with 30 per cent of its real income and 50 per cent of government revenue. The closure lead to the loss of jobs, raising the unemployment rate to almost 20 per cent. The significant blow to the economy led to a push for a dramatic increase in tourism, and that sector has expanded to become the island's largest industry. At a convention in The Hague in 1990, at the request of Prime Minister Nelson Oduber, the governments of Aruba, the Netherlands, and the Netherlands Antilles postponed indefinitely Aruba's transition to full independence. The article scheduling Aruba's complete independence was rescinded in 1995, although it was decided that the process could be revived after another referendum.

== Geography ==
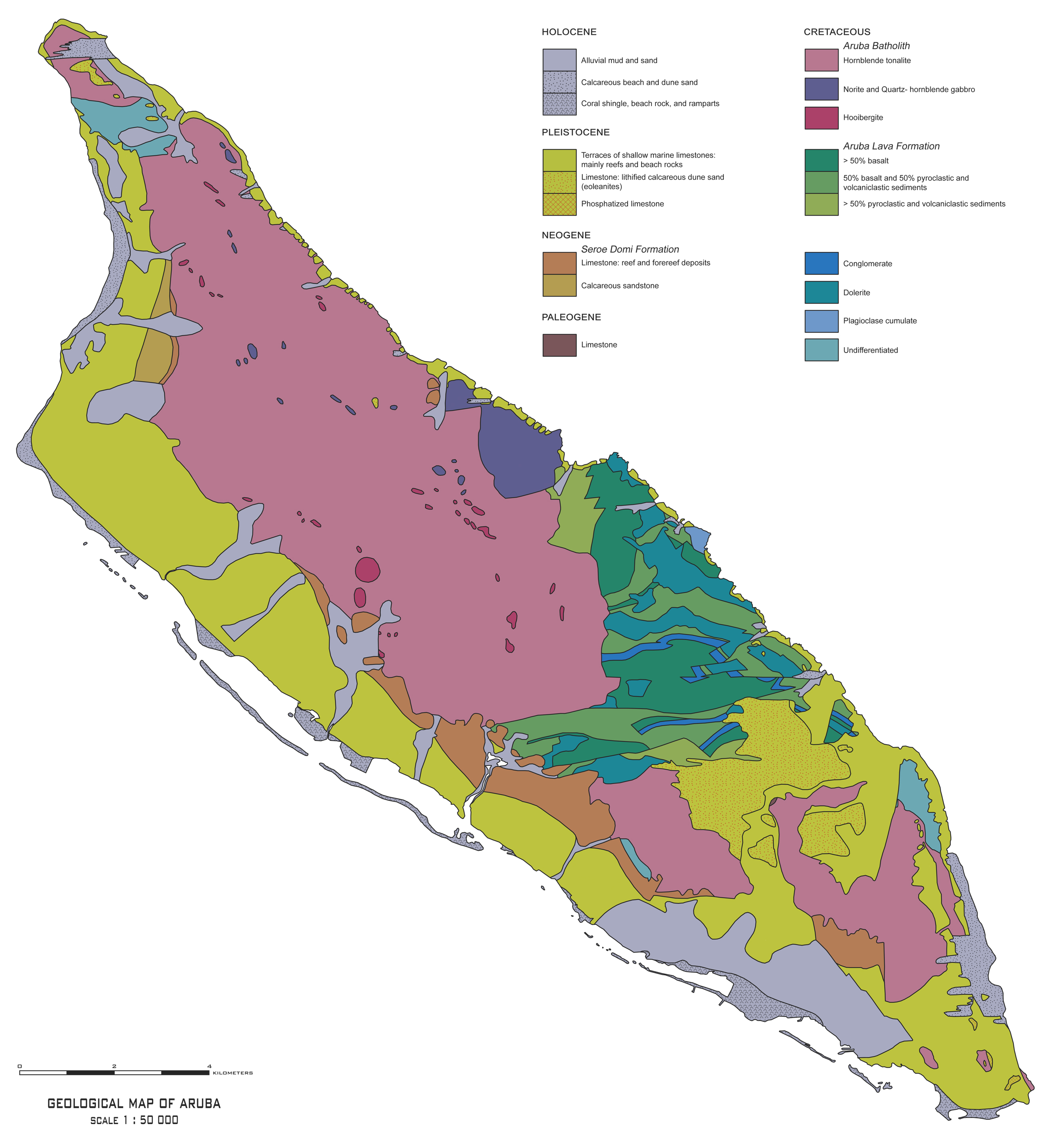
Geological map of Aruba

Aruba is located 77 kilometres (48 mi) west of Curaçao and 29 kilometres (18 mi) north of Paraguaná Peninsula of Venezuela. Aruba showcases three distinct landscapes. The north-western region is primarily characterised by flat batholith landscapes. Notable landmarks include the conical Hooiberg hill and rock formations like Ayo and Casibari. Moreover, the north-eastern part of the island features the oldest formations known as the Aruba Lava Formation. This region is marked by rolling hills, including Jamanota, and is home to Arikok National Park, and limestone terraces surround these two landscapes. The low-lying limestone terrace regions are defined by their white sandy beaches and the high plateaus on the north side of the island, in contrast, are constantly battered by the rough waters of the ocean, featuring caves and small natural bridge formations.

The arid landscape in Aruba is not solely a product of its climate but is also a consequence of extensive deforestation and exploitation during the Spanish colonisation of the island. Consequently, certain crops, such as aloe vera, thrive in this environment due to the high calcium-rich soil known as liming. As of 2022, Aruba only has 2.3% of forest-covered land area and only 0.5% of protected natural area. The Aruba Conservation Foundation, established in 2003, oversees the management of the conservation of 16 established protected areas, which encompass a total of nearly 25% of the island's surface, as well as four Marine protected areas (MPAs) The Arikok National Park, established as formal conservation land in 2000, covers 20% of the island. Forest cover is around 2% of the total land area, equivalent to 420 hectares (ha) of forest in 2020, which was unchanged from 1990. None of the forest was reported to be primary forest (consisting of native tree species with no clearly visible indications of human activity), and no forest area was found within protected areas.

The geography includes naturally formed rooi or gullies that channel rainwater towards dams and ultimately the ocean. Other than Arikok National Park, the Bubali Bird Sanctuary is the only significant body of water on the island that holds the status of protected nature reserve and serves as a brackish water lagoon.

=== Regions ===
Aruba is divided into eight regions for census purposes, with no administrative function. Some correspond to parishes and include several community facilities.

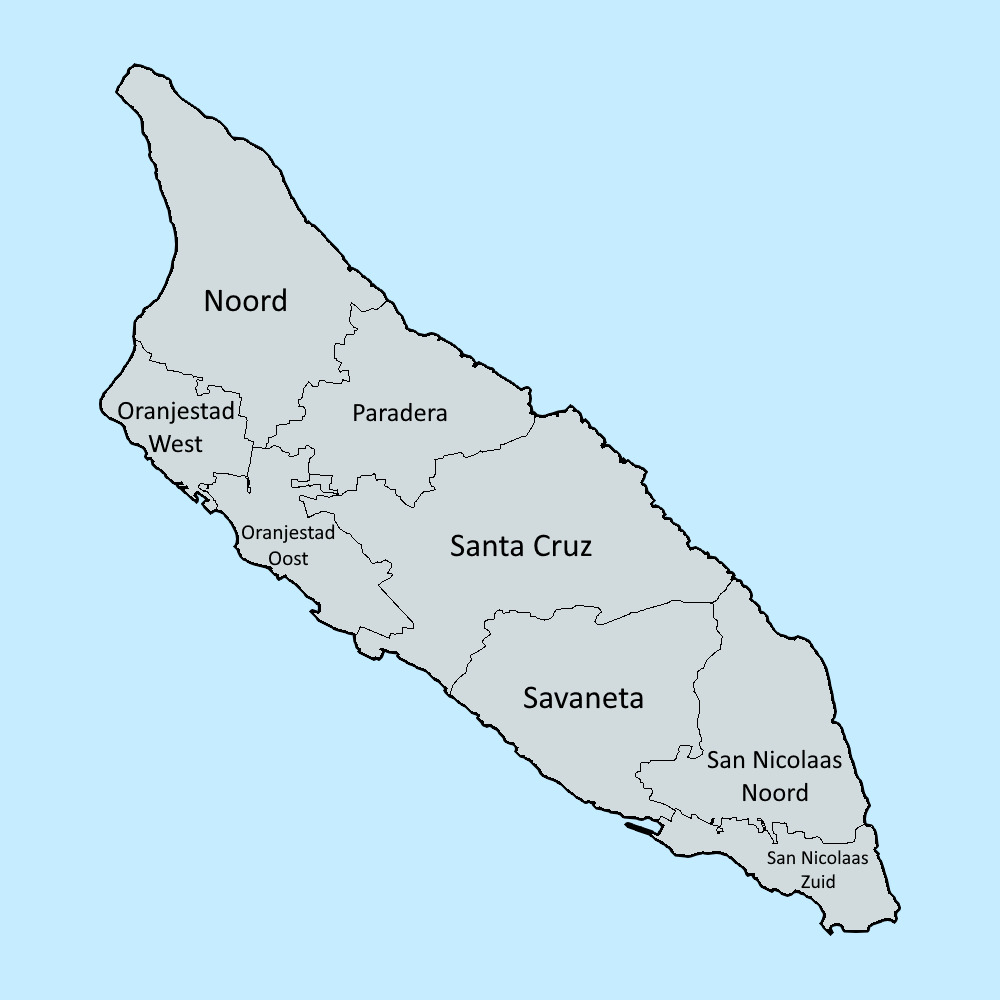
Regions of Aruba

| Name | Area (km^{2}) | Population 1991 census | Population 2000 census | Population 2010 census | Population 2020 census |
|---|---|---|---|---|---|
| Noord | 34.62 | 10,056 | 16,944 | 21,495 | 24,193 |
| Oranjestad West | 9.29 | 8,779 | 12,131 | 13,976 | 13,735 |
| Oranjestad East | 12.88 | 11,266 | 14,224 | 14,318 | 14,923 |
| Paradera | 20.49 | 6,189 | 9,037 | 12,024 | 13,834 |
| San Nicolaas Noord | 23.19 | 8,206 | 10,118 | 10,433 | 9,940 |
| San Nicolaas Zuid | 9.64 | 5,304 | 5,730 | 4,850 | 4,235 |
| Santa Cruz | 41.04 | 9,587 | 12,326 | 12,870 | 15,236 |
| Savaneta | 27.76 | 7,273 | 9,996 | 11,518 | 11,955 |
| Total Aruba | 178.91 | 66,687 | 90,506 | 101,484 | 108,166 |

=== Flora and fauna ===
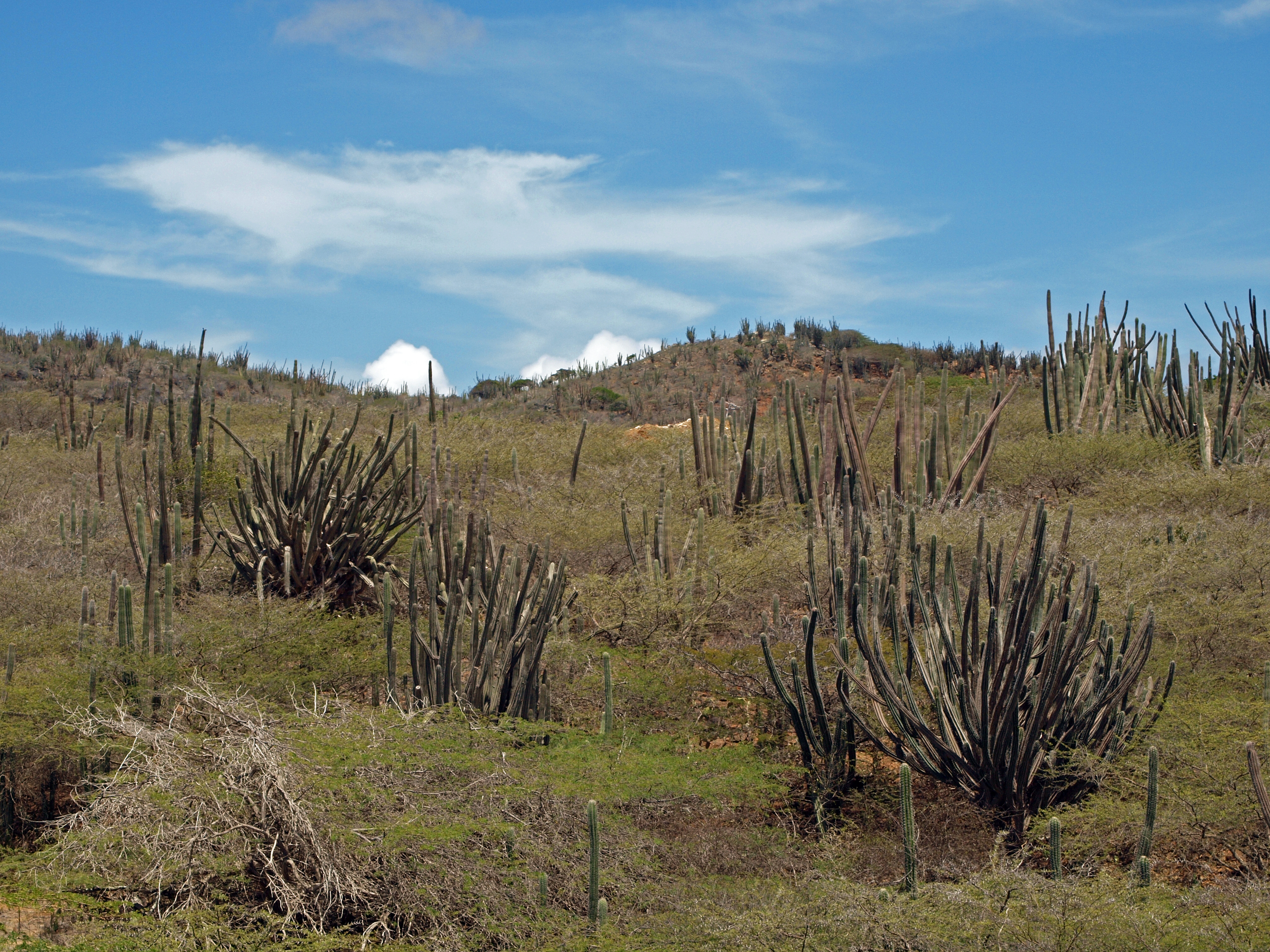
Cacti on the rolling hills of Arikok National Park

The landscape is characterised by common xeric scrublands featuring various cacti, thorny shrubs, and evergreen plants. Notably, aloe vera is also found on the island, and its economic significance has led to its inclusion on the coat of arms of Aruba. Cacti include Melocactus and Opuntia, with Opuntia stricta being prominent. Drought-tolerant trees like Caesalpinia coriaria and Vachellia tortuosa are present. The isolation from the South America mainland contributed to the evolution of multiple endemic species. The island provides a habitat for unique wildlife, including the endemic Aruban whiptail, Aruba rattlesnake, as well as subspecies of Aruban burrowing owl and brown-throated parakeet.

=== Climate and natural hazards ===
Aruba

Climate chart (precipitation, max. and min. temperature)
| J | F | M | A | M | J | J | A | S | O | N | D |
| 44 30 25 | 20 31 25 | 10 31 25 | 8.6 32 26 | 14 32 27 | 17 33 27 | 20 32 27 | 31 33 27 | 43 33 27 | 77 32 27 | 87 32 26 | 80 31 25 |
- █ Average max. and min. temperatures in °C
- █ Precipitation totals in mm
Imperial conversion
| J | F | M | A | M | J | J | A | S | O | N | D |
| 1.7 87 77 | 0.8 87 77 | 0.4 88 78 | 0.3 89 79 | 0.6 90 80 | 0.7 91 80 | 0.8 90 80 | 1.2 92 81 | 1.7 92 81 | 3 90 80 | 3.4 89 79 | 3.2 87 78 |
- █ Average max. and min. temperatures in °F
- █ Precipitation totals in inches

According to the Köppen climate classification, Aruba is characterised by a hot semi-arid climate (Köppen BSh), characterised by limited rainfall, totalling just 500 millimetres or 20 inches annually. Notably, Aruba remains dry even during its supposed rainy season. Rainfall can be highly variable, ranging from as little as 150 millimetres or 6 inches during strong El Niño years (e.g. 1911/1912, 1930/1931, 1982/1983, 1997/1998) to over 1,000 millimetres or 39 inches in La Niña years, such as 1933/1934, 1970/1971 or 1988/1989.

An exception to the general aridity is observed during the short rainy season from September to January. During this period, the southward retreat of the Intertropical Convergence Zone leads to more frequent moist north-easterly winds. Aruba is positioned south of the Main Development Region for tropical cyclones and generally avoids the direct impact of these storms. However, late in the 2020 Atlantic hurricane season, the island was affected by two hurricanes in their early stages.

In Oranjestad, mean monthly temperatures remain consistently moderate, with little variation (low diurnal temperature variation) ranging from 27.0 °C (80.6 °F) to 29.6 °C (85.3 °F). This temperature stability is moderated by the constant trade winds originating from the north-east, sweeping in from the Atlantic Ocean.

== Demographics ==
National origins
| Nationality | percent |
| Aruban | 66% |
| Colombian | 9.1% |
| Other | 6.2% |
| Dutch | 4.3% |
| Dominican | 4.1% |
| Venezuelan | 3.2% |
| Curaçaoan | 2.2% |
| Haitian | 1.5% |
| Surinamese | 1.2% |
| Peruvian | 1.1% |
| Chinese | 1.1% |

In terms of country of birth, the population is estimated to be 66% Aruban, 9.1% Colombian, 4.3% Dutch, 5.1% Dominican, 3.2% Venezuelan, 2.2% Curaçaoan, 1.5% Haitian, 1.2% Surinamese, 1.1% Peruvian, 1.1% Chinese, 6.2% from other backgrounds. In terms of nationality, the population is estimated to be 78.7% Dutch, 6.6% Colombian, 5.5% Venezuelan, 2.8% Dominican; 1.3% Haitian, and 5.1% from other backgrounds (As of 2020). In 2019, recently arrived Venezuelan refugees were estimated to number around 17,000 on Aruba, accounting for some 15% of the population.

The majority of Aruba's population is of mixed ancestry, including European, Amerindian and African roots. Various minorities of other origins (such as Asian) and over 140 nationalities also reside on the island. Aruba's population has strong Arawak heritage compared to most Caribbean islands. Although there are no full-blooded Aboriginals remaining, the features of many islanders' clearly reflect their genetic Arawak heritage. Aruba's population is primarily descended from Caquetío Indians, Dutch and Spanish settlers, and enslaved Africans, and to a lesser extent from later migrants from South America, the Caribbean, Europe and Asia.

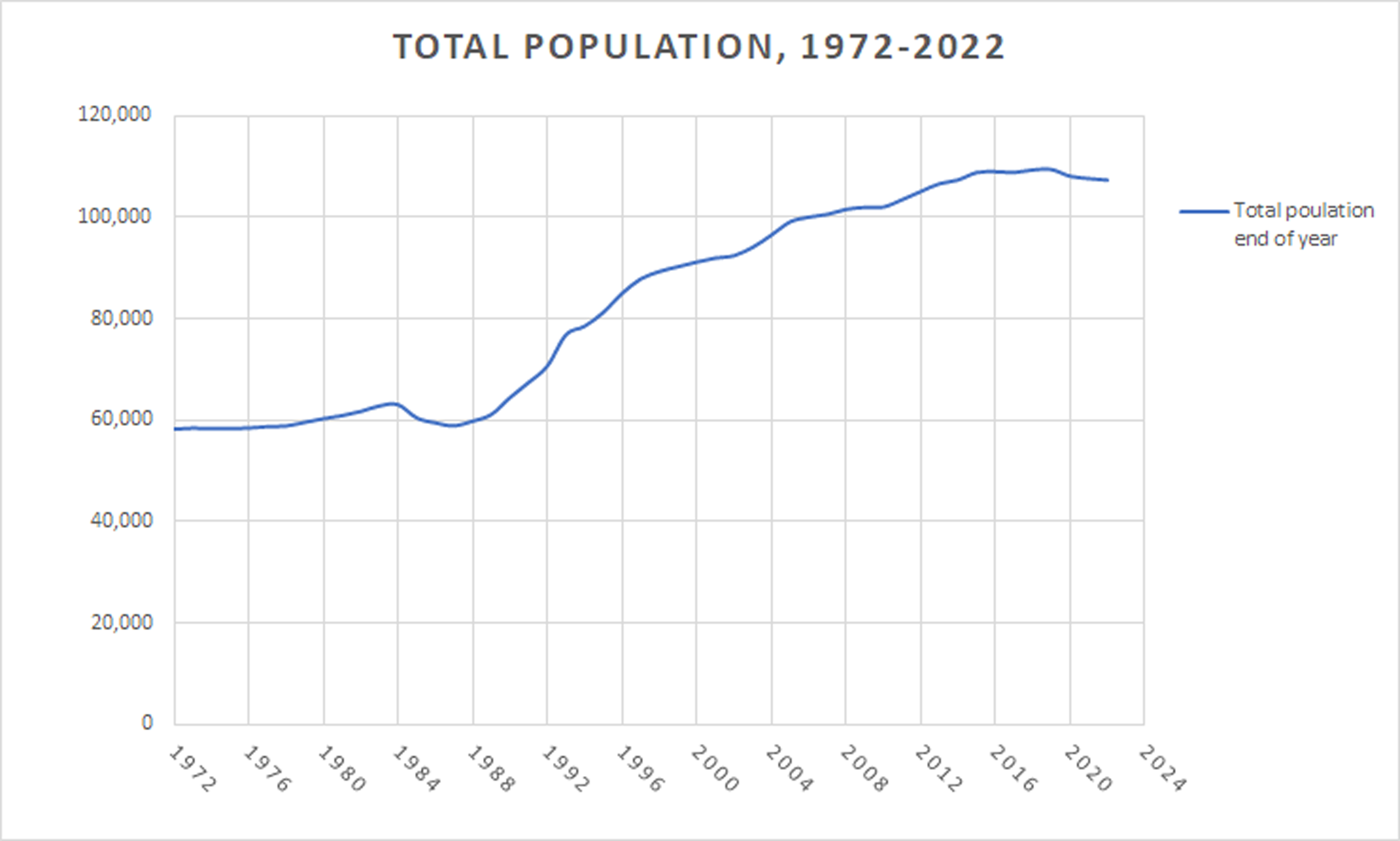
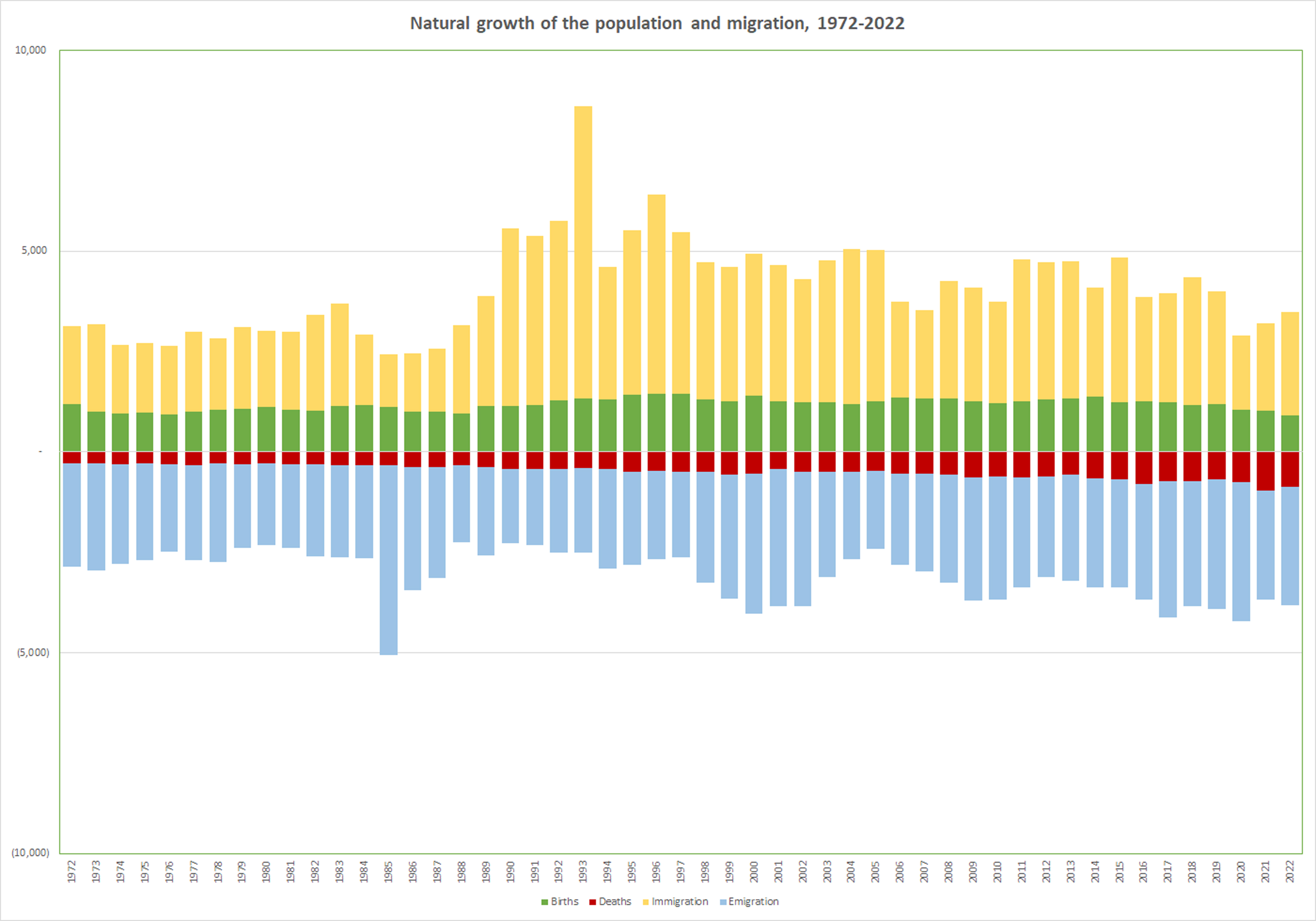
In Aruba, population development is primarily influenced by net migration due to the relatively low number of births and deaths (1972–2022). Source: Central Bureau of Statistics, and Civil Registry and Population Office.

The population experienced fluctuations between 1972 and 2022, primarily influenced by net migration. While there have been periods of significant growth, there have also been declines, especially during economic challenges. Notably, between 1988 and 2016, the population nearly doubled. However, in 2017, a decline occurred, breaking almost three decades of continuous growth. The first three years of the ongoing COVID-19 pandemic (2020–2022) also contributed to a population decrease, mainly due to reduced births and emigration.

As of the 1st quarter in 2025, the population stood at 108,880 people, marking a modest 0.4% growth compared to the previous year. This increase was driven by a significant rise in immigration, which saw a 20.4 per cent uptick.

=== Language ===
Primary Language of Arubans
| Languages | percent |
| Papiamento | 63.3% |
| Dutch | 15% |
| Spanish | 11.5% |
| English | 5% |
| Chinese | 1.4% |
| None | 1.5% |
| Other | 1.7% |
| Not Stated | 0.4% |
Housing census 2010

Aruba is a multilingual society. The official languages are Dutch and Papiamento. While Dutch is the sole language for all administration and legal matters, Papiamento is the predominant language used in Aruba. Papiamento is a Portuguese/Spanish-based creole language, spoken on Aruba, Bonaire, and Curaçao that also incorporates words from the Caquetío language, Dutch, various West-African languages and English. English and Spanish are also widely spoken on the island, their usage having grown due to tourism and immigration. Other common languages spoken, based on the size of their community, include Portuguese, Chinese, French and German.

In recent years, the government has shown an increased interest in acknowledging the cultural and historical importance of Papiamento. Although spoken Papiamento is fairly similar among the several Papiamento-speaking islands, the orthography differs per island, with Aruba using etymological spelling (Papiamento), and Curaçao and Bonaire a phonetic spelling (Papiamentu).

The book Buccaneers of America, first published in 1678, states through eyewitness account that the natives on Aruba spoke Spanish already. Spanish became an important language in the 18th century due to the close economic ties with Spanish colonies in what are now Venezuela and Colombia. Venezuelan TV networks are received on the island, and there are significant communities of Venezuelans and Colombians on Aruba. Around 13% of the population today speaks Spanish natively. Use of English dates to the early 19th century, when the British ruled Curaçao, Aruba, and Bonaire. When Dutch rule resumed in 1815, officials already noted wide use of the language. There is also a little studied native variety of English Creole spoken in San Nicolaas, known as San Nicolaas English, Sani English and Village Talk.

Aruba has newspapers published in Papiamento: Diario, Bon Dia, Solo di Pueblo and Awe Mainta; English: Aruba Daily, Aruba Today and The News; and Dutch: Amigoe. There are 18 radio stations (two AM and sixteen FM) and two local television stations (Telearuba and Channel 22).

=== Religion ===
Religions of Aruba
| Religions | percent |
| Roman Catholic | 75.3% |
| None | 5.5% |
| Protestant | 4.9% |
| Other | 4.4% |
| Jehovah's Witness | 1.7% |
| Unspecified | 0.5% |

Roman Catholicism is the dominant religion on Aruba, followed by approximately 75% of the population (Diocese of Willemstad). In addition to Catholicism, there is a diverse range of religions practised including Protestantism, Islam, Hinduism, Judaism and African diaspora religions.

The Lourdes grotto, named after the famous French religious pilgrimage site, was constructed in 1958 by a priest named Erkamp and his parishioners. This shrine is nestled into the rocks of Seroe Preto, just off the main road to San Nicolas. Inside the cave, there is a 700-kilogram (1,500 lb) statue of the Virgin Mary, easily visible from the main road. Each year, on 11 February (the feast of Lady Lourdes), a procession departs from St. Theresita Church in San Nicolas and heads to the grotto, where a Mass is held.

== Government ==
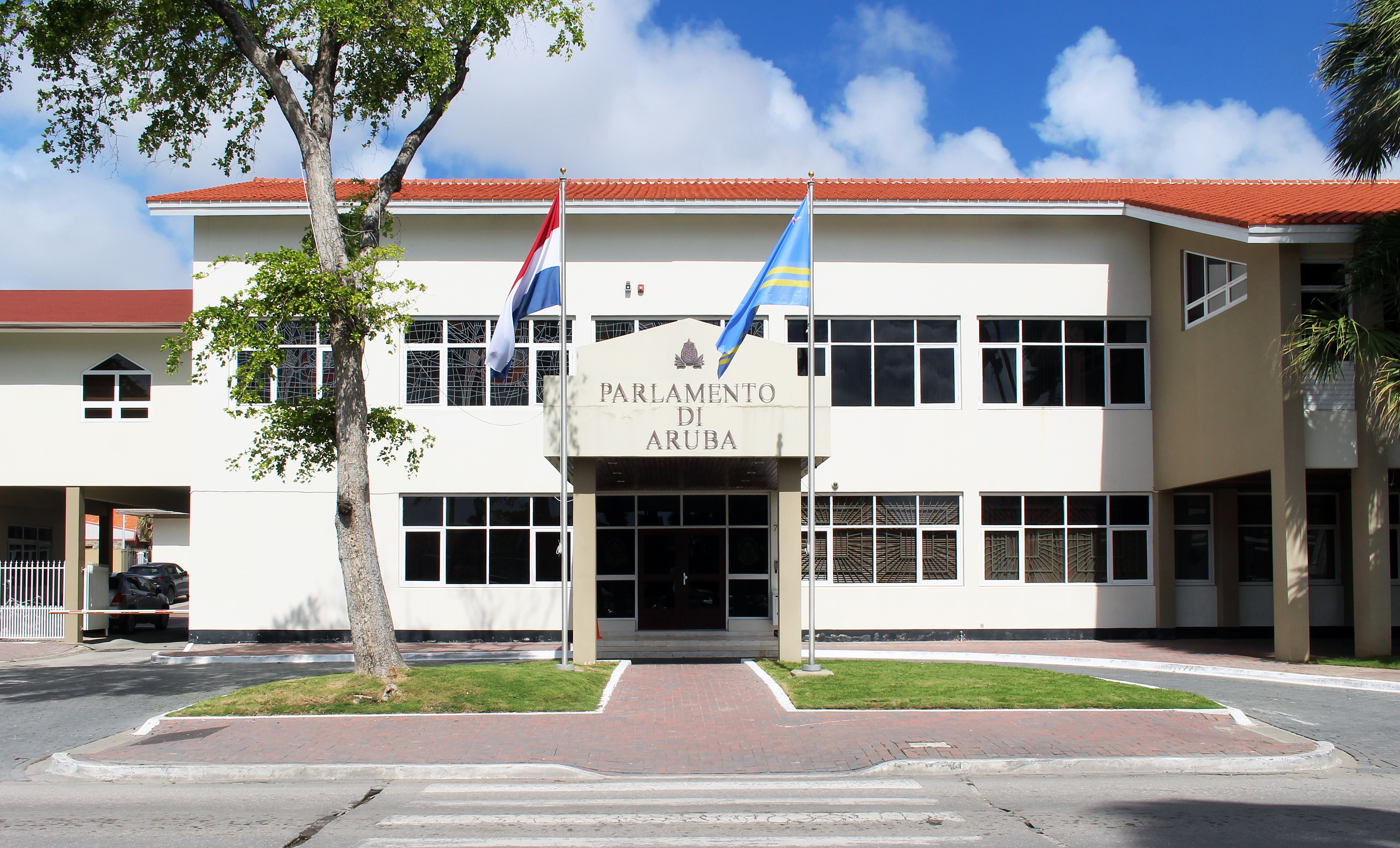
Parliament of Aruba in Oranjestad

Along with the Netherlands, Curaçao, and Sint Maarten, Aruba is a constituent country of the Kingdom of the Netherlands, with internal autonomy. Matters such as foreign affairs and defence are handled by the Netherlands. Aruba's politics take place within a framework of a 21-member Staten (Parliament) and an eight-member Cabinet; the Staten's 21 members are elected by direct, popular vote to serve a four-year term. The governor of Aruba is appointed for a six-year term by the monarch, and the prime minister and deputy prime minister are indirectly elected by the Staten for four-year terms.

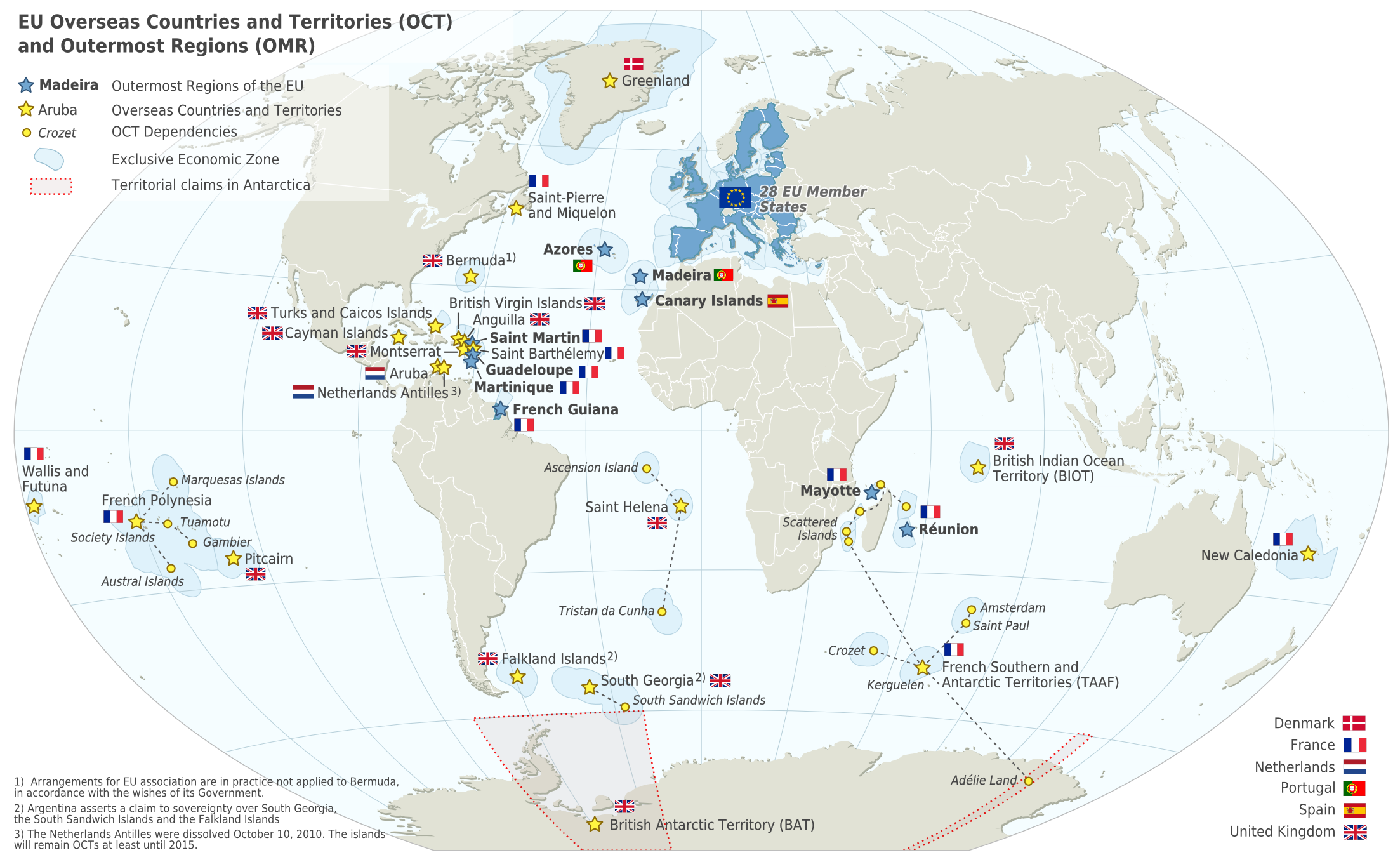
Map of the European Union in the world with overseas countries and territories and outermost regions

=== Politics ===
The legal system is based on the Dutch model. Legal jurisdiction lies with the Gerecht in Eerste Aanleg (Court of First Instance), the Gemeenschappelijk Hof van Justitie van Aruba, Curaçao, Sint Maarten, en van Bonaire, Sint Eustatius en Saba (Joint Court of Justice of Aruba, Curaçao, Sint Maarten, and of Bonaire, Sint Eustatius and Saba) and the Hoge Raad der Nederlanden (Supreme Court of Justice of the Netherlands). The Korps Politie Aruba (Aruba Police Force) is the law enforcement agency and operates district precincts in Oranjestad, Noord, San Nicolaas, and Santa Cruz, where it is headquartered.

Divergent Legal Protections from the rest of the Kingdom of the Netherlands include not being part of the Law Enforcement Council (Raad van de Rechtshandhaving), which is a legal entity based on the Kingdom Act of the 7 July 2010 the Kingdom Act on the Law Enforcement Council. Aruba is the only country in the kingdom that does not have an ombudsman.

Deficit spending has been a staple in Aruba's history, and modestly high inflation has been present as well. By 2006, the government's debt had grown to 1.883 billion Aruban florins. In 2006, the government changed several tax laws to reduce the deficit. Direct taxes have been converted to indirect taxes as proposed by the International Monetary Fund.

=== Foreign relations ===
Aruba is one of the overseas countries and territories (OCT) of the European Union and maintains economic and cultural relations with the European Union and the United States. Aruba is also a member of several international organisations such as the International Monetary Fund and Interpol. Although not officially a part of the European Union, Aruba does receive support from the European Development Fund.

=== Military ===
Defence is the responsibility of the Kingdom of the Netherlands. The Dutch Armed Forces that protect the island include the Navy, Marine Corps, and the Coastguard including a platoon-sized national guard. All forces are stationed at Marines base in Savaneta. In 1999 the US Department of Defense established a forward operating site the airport.

== Education ==
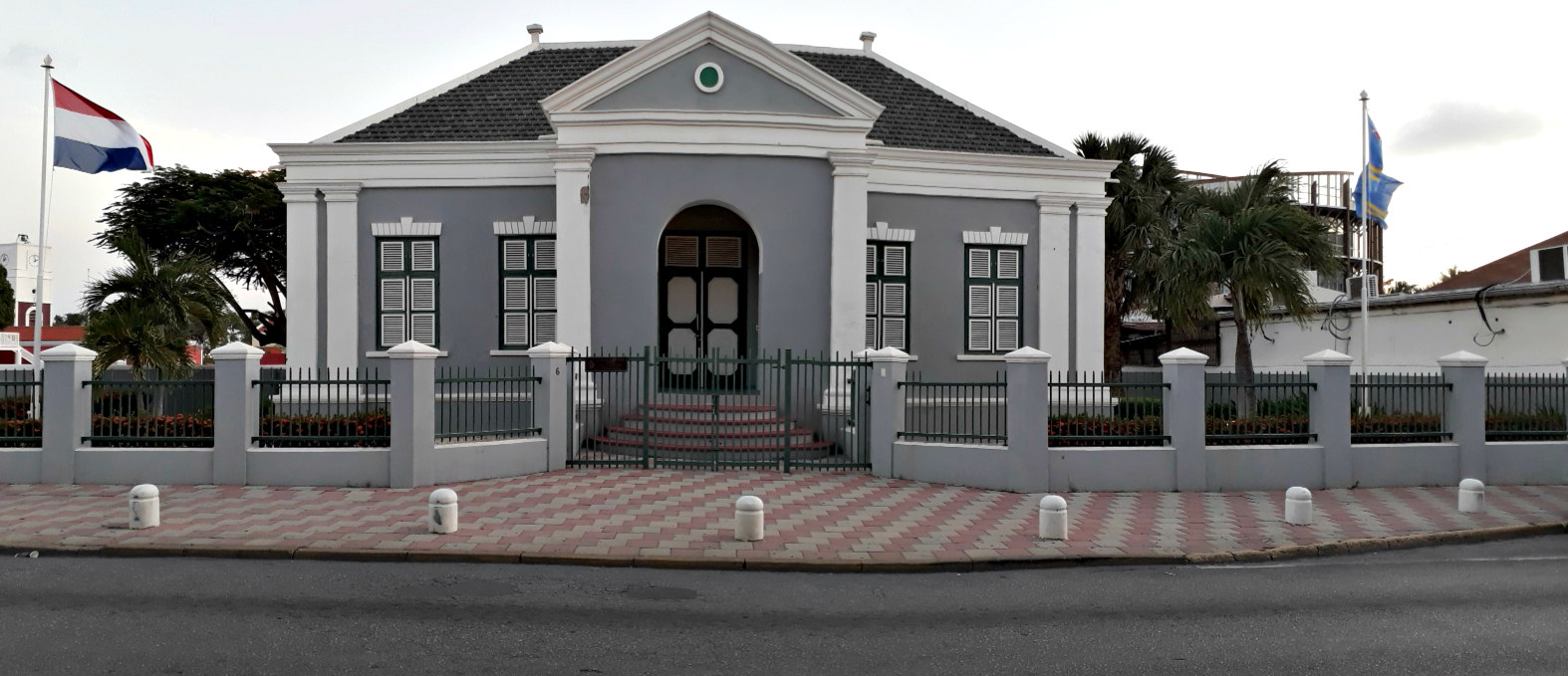
First public elementary school (1888), currently houses the Council of Advise and the General Court of Audit since 1982.

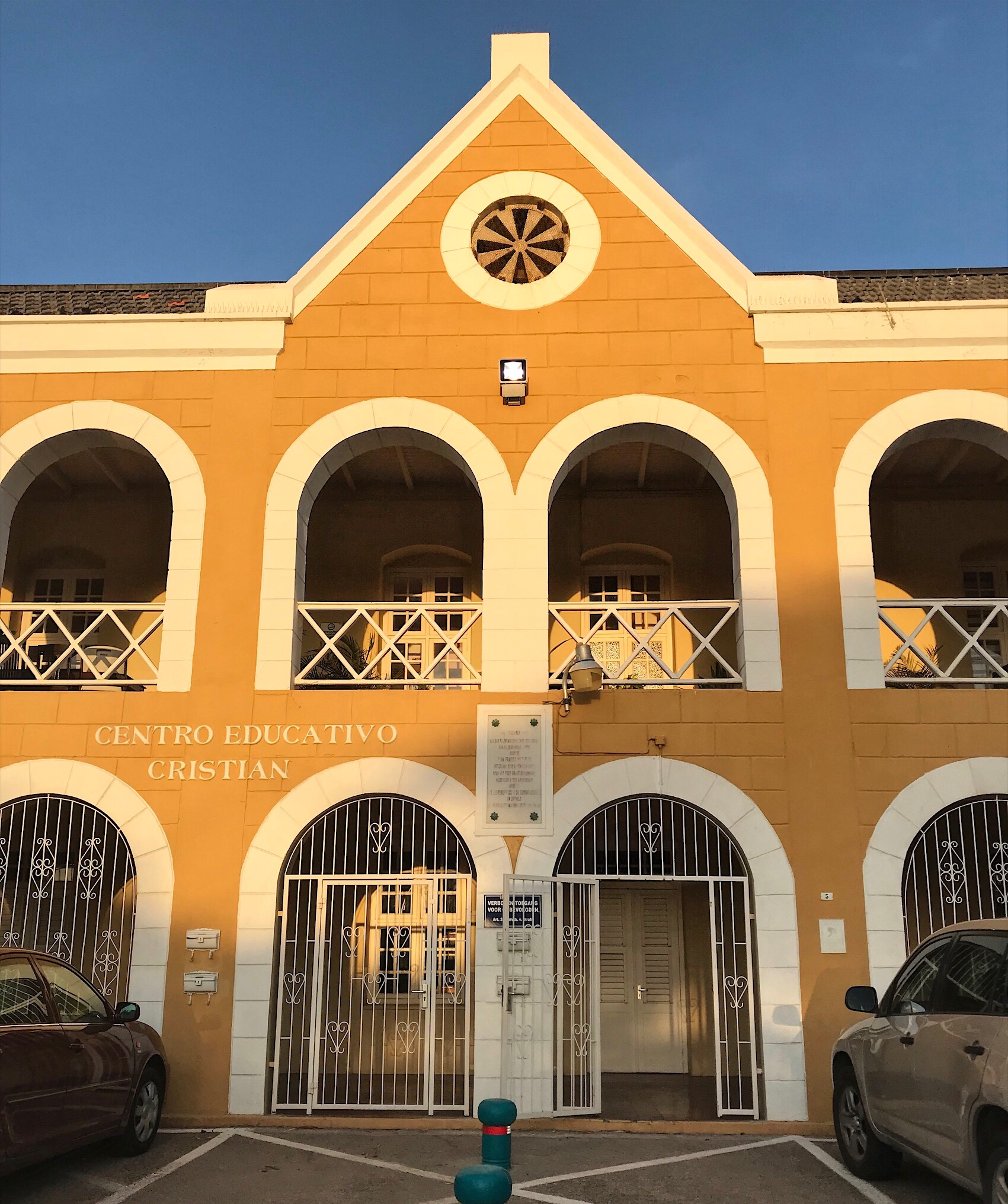
University of Aruba

Historically, Dutch was not widely spoken on the island, except within colonial administration, and its usage increased in the late 19th and early 20th centuries. Students in Curaçao, Aruba, and Bonaire were predominantly taught in Spanish until the late 18th century. Dutch serves as the primary language of instruction, with Papiamento taught as a subject in the lower grades of secondary education.

The educational system mirrors the Dutch education structure, with public national education financed by the government of Aruba. The education landscape includes a mix of public and private institutions, such as the International School of Aruba, the Schakel College and Colegio Arubano.

The University of Aruba is the national university. Aruba has three medical schools, American University School of Medicine Aruba, Aureus University School of Medicine and Xavier University School of Medicine.

== Economy ==
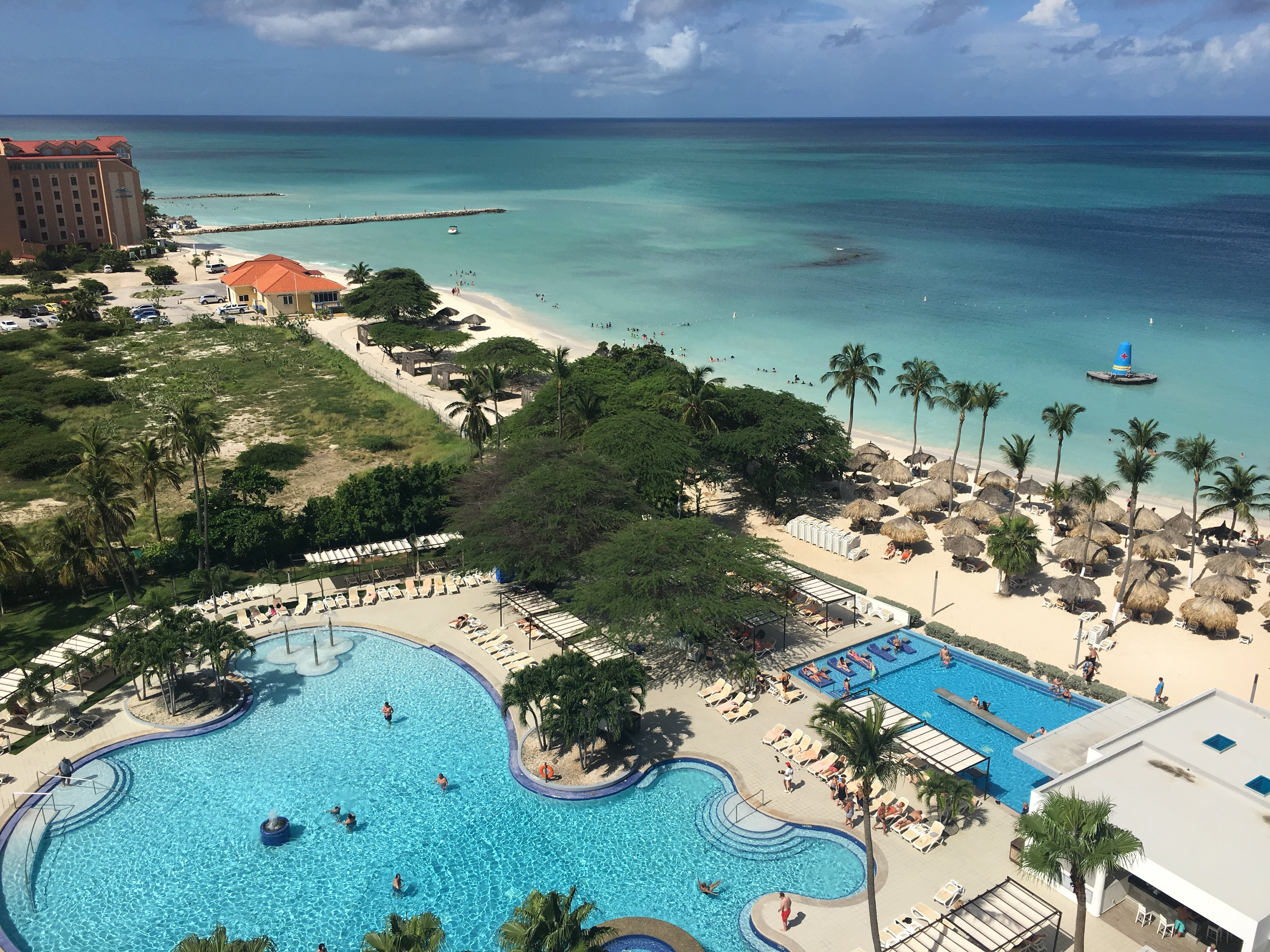
A tourist resort on the island

The economy is dominated by four main industries: tourism, aloe export, petroleum refining, and offshore banking. Aruba has one of the highest standards of living in the Caribbean region, a low unemployment rate and is classified as a high-income economy by the World Bank. The GDP per capita (PPP) was estimated to be $37,500 in 2017. Its main trading partners are Colombia, the United States, Venezuela, and the Netherlands.

The agriculture and manufacturing sectors are fairly minimal. Gold mining was important in the 19th century. Aloe was introduced in 1840 but did not become a big export until 1890. Cornelius Eman founded Aruba Aloe Balm, and over time the industry became very important to the economy. At one point, two-thirds of the island was covered in aloe vera fields, and Aruba became the largest exporter of aloe in the world. The industry continues today, though on a smaller scale.

Access to biocapacity is much lower than world average. In 2016, Aruba had 0.57 global hectares of biocapacity per person within its territory, much less than the world average of 1.6 global hectares per person. In 2016, Aruba used 6.5 global hectares of biocapacity per person—their ecological footprint of consumption. This means they use almost 12 times the biocapacity that Aruba contains. This is the extent of Aruba's biocapacity deficit.

The official exchange rate of the Aruban florin is pegged to the US dollar at Afl 1.80 to US$1.00. This fact, and the majority of tourists being US, means businesses of hotel and resort districts prefer to bank and trade with the consumer in US dollars. Aruba is a prosperous country. Unemployment is low (although the government has not published statistics since 2013) and per capita income is one of the highest in the Caribbean (approximately $24,087). At the end of 2018, the labour force participation rate was 56.6% for women.

Until the mid-1980s, the main industry was oil refining; the refinery was shut down, and the economy shifted towards tourism. The refinery has been closed and restarted repeatedly during the last decades. In recent years a letter of intent was signed with CITGO (the US subsidiary of the Venezuelan state oil company PDVSA) to explore the possibility of reopening the refinery again.

Until 2009, the Netherlands granted development aid to Aruba. This aid was mainly for law enforcement, education, administrative development, health care and sustainable economic development. This aid was discontinued at Aruba's request in 2009. Since 2015, however, a form of financial supervision has been reintroduced because debt has risen sharply to over 80% of GDP. Aruba has two free trade zones (Barcadera and Bushiri), where import and export and the movement of services are tax-free.

=== Tourism ===
Tourist arrivals of 2024 in %

Aruba has a large and well-developed tourism industry, receiving 1,082,000 tourists who stayed overnight in its territory in 2018. About 75% of the gross national product is earned through tourism and related activities. Most tourists are from North America, with a market-share of 73.3%, followed by Latin America with 15.2% and Europe with 8.3%. In 2018, there were 40,231 visitors from the Netherlands.

For private aircraft passengers bound for the United States, the United States Department of Homeland Security, US Customs and Border Protection has a full pre-clearance facility since 1 February 2001 when Queen Beatrix Airport expanded. Since 2008, Aruba has been the only island to have this service for private flights.

== Culture ==
Aruba boasts a diverse culture. According to the Bureau Burgelijke Stand en Bevolkingsregister (BBSB, Civil Registry and Population Register), in 2005, the island was home to people from 92 different nationalities. Dutch influence is still evident in traditions like the celebration of Sinterklaas (Saint Nicholas) on 5 and 6 December, as well as national holidays like 27 April when Aruba, along with the rest of the Kingdom of the Netherlands, celebrates Koningsdag (King's day) or Dia di Rey (in Papiamento) is celebrated.

On 18 March, Aruba celebrates its National Anthem and Flag Day. Christmas and New Year's Eve are celebrated with the typical music and songs of gaitas for Christmas and the dande for New Year. Traditional food and drinks like ayaca, ponche crema, ham, and more are also parts of the festive season. 25 January is dedicated to celebrating Betico Croes day, while 24 June is the day for Dia di San Juan. In addition to Christmas, religious holidays such as the Feast of the Ascension and Good Friday are observed.

Aruba's Carnaval is a significant cultural event, akin to celebrations in other Caribbean and Latin American countries. It began in the 1950s, influenced by residents from Venezuela and nearby islands (Curaçao, St. Vincent, Trinidad, Barbados, St. Maarten and Anguilla) who worked at the oil refinery. The Carnaval Celebrations now spans from early January until Fat Tuesday, featuring a grand parade on the final Sunday of the festivities.

Andrew Holleran's Nights in Aruba (1983) is a semi-fictional memoir in part set in Aruba in the 1950s, when the author's father was a manager at the Standard Oil, later Exxon, Lago Refinery which operated from 1924 to 1985.

Aruba has seen an increased influence of American culture with rising tourism from the United States. This is evident in the adoption of American celebrations like Halloween in October and Thanksgiving Day in November.

=== Architecture ===
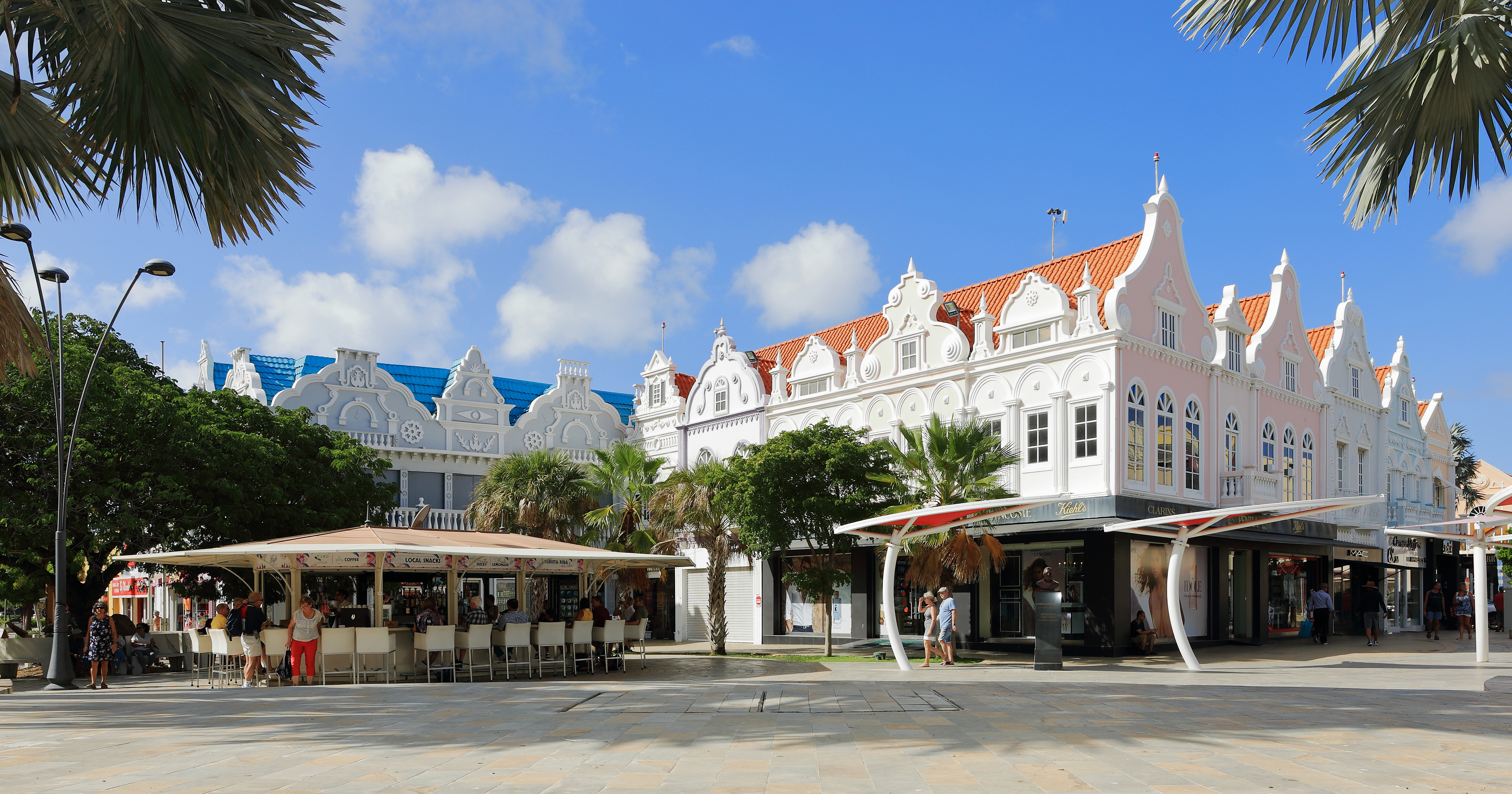
Ornate buildings in Oranjestad

From the beginning of the colonisation of the Netherlands until the beginning of the 20th century, the architecture in the most inhabited areas was influenced by the Dutch colonial style and also some Spanish elements from the Catholic missionaries. After the boom of the oil industry and the tourist sector in the 20th century, the architectural style of the island incorporated a more American and international influence. In addition, elements of the Art Deco style can still be seen in several buildings in San Nicolas. Therefore, it can be said that the island's architecture is a mixture of Spanish, Dutch, American and Caribbean influences.

=== Sport ===
The most popular sports in Aruba are association football, basketball, baseball and volleyball, as well as beach sports. Aruba has competed at the Olympic Games since 1988.

== Infrastructure ==
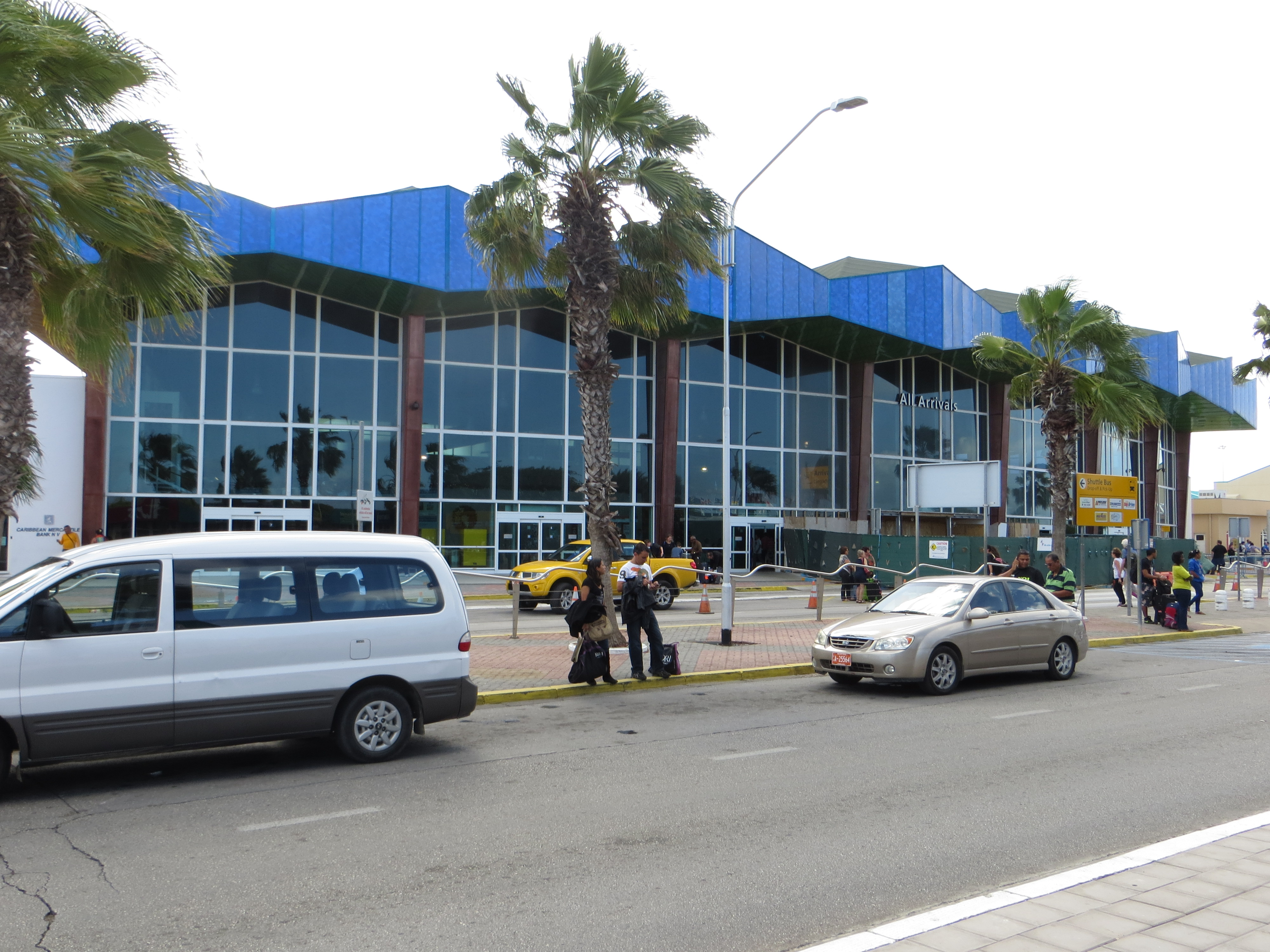
The Arrivals building at Queen Beatrix International Airport

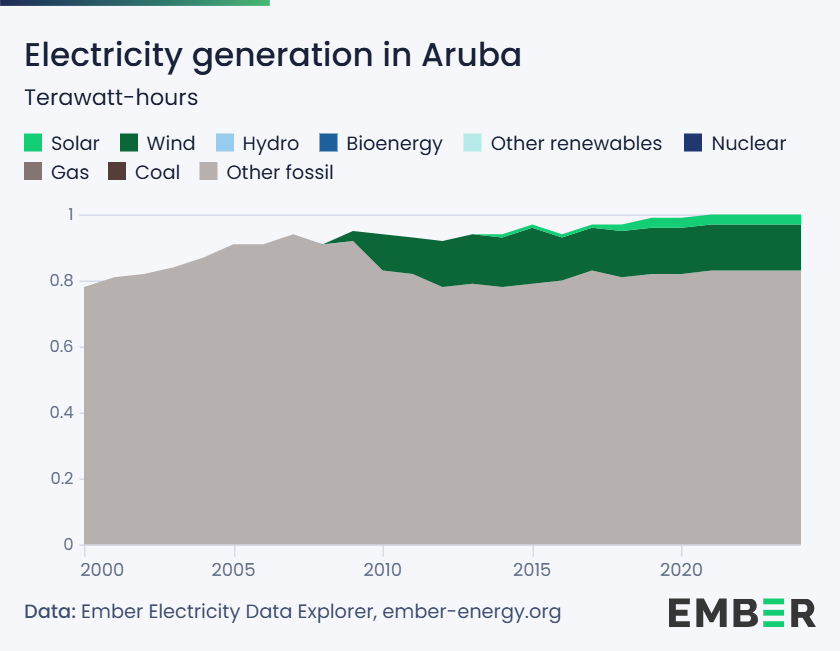
Electricity generation in Aruba in terawatt-hours

Queen Beatrix International Airport is near Oranjestad. Aruba has four ports: Barcadera, the main cargo port; Paardenbaai, the cruise ship terminal in Oranjestad/Taratata; Commandeurs Baai (Commander's Bay) in Savaneta; and Sint Nicolaas Baai in San Nicolaas. Paardenbaai services all the cruise-ship lines such as Royal Caribbean, Carnival, NCL, Holland America, MSC Cruises, Costa Cruises, P&O Cruises and Disney. Nearly one million tourists enter this port per year. Aruba Ports Authority, owned and operated by the Aruban government, runs these seaports.

Arubus is a government-owned bus company. Its buses operate from 3:30 a.m. until 12:30 a.m., 365 days a year. Private minibuses/people movers service zones such as the Hotel Area, San Nicolaas, Santa Cruz and Noord. A streetcar service runs on rails on the main street of Oranjestad.

In December 2009, the first wind farm in Aruba, the Vader Piet Wind Farm, was commissioned. With a capacity of 30 MW, it produces a sizeable portion of Aruba's electricity.

Water- en Energiebedrijf Aruba, N.V. (W.E.B.) produces and distributes potable water and power. Average daily water consumption in Aruba is about 35,600 cubic metres (46,600 cu yd) per day, and average power generation is 104 MW. W.E.B. produces electricity, which is distributed by N.V. Elmar. Both companies share the same parent holding which is Utilities Aruba N.V. The Sunrise Solar Park was installed and opened in 2018.

There are three sewage treatment plants at Zeewijk, Parkietenbos and Bubali. The one in Bubali (near the bird sanctuary) is 4 decades old and is processing over 8,000 cubic metres (10,000 cu yd) per day, around double its original capacity of 4,500 cubic metres (5,900 cu yd) per day (due to Aruba's growth). A solid waste landfill (16 hectares [40 acres]) is located at Parkietenbos. The capacity is between 130 and 150 kilotons per year. Sometimes there are huge spontaneous fires creating pollution.

There are two telecommunications providers: government-based Setar, and privately owned Digicel. Digicel is Setar's competitor in wireless technology using the GSM platform.

== Places of interest ==
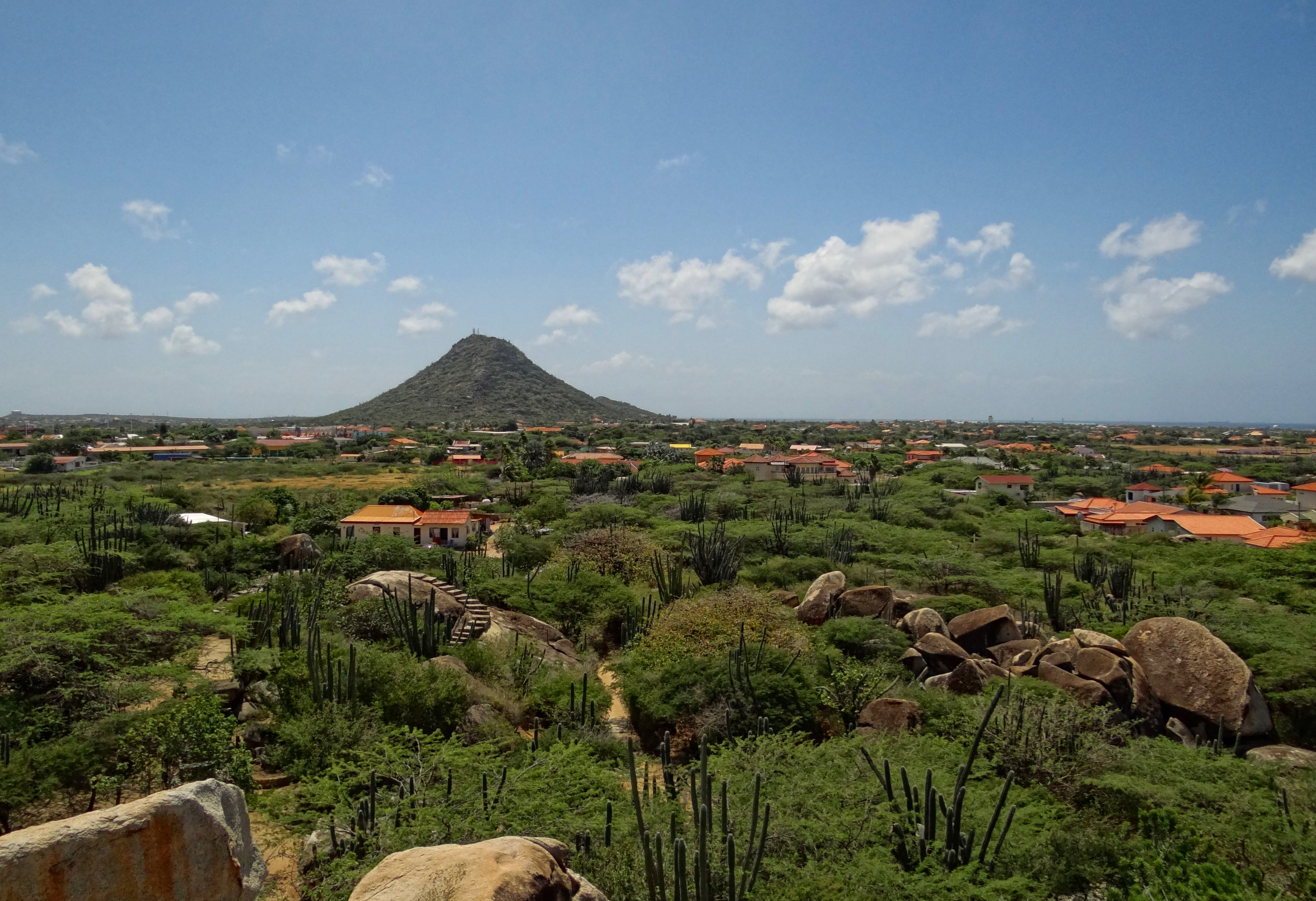
Hooiberg (hill)

- Alto Vista Chapel
- Arikok National Park
- Ayo and Casibari Rock Formations
- Bushiribana and Balashi
- California Lighthouse
- Frenchman's Pass
- Hooiberg
- Jamanota
- Natural Pool
- Quadiriki Caves
- Sint Nicolaas
- Lago Colony
- Beaches of Aruba
- Aruba Natural Bridge

== See also ==
- Index of Aruba-related articles
- Outline of Aruba

== Sources ==
- Alofs, Luc (11 February 1995). "De Rode Rand van de Slavernij, 1809–1914 : Rode Slavernij op Koloniaal Aruba" [The Red Edge of Slavery, 1809–1914: Red Slavery on Colonial Aruba] (in Dutch).
- Brenneker, Paul Hubert Franz (1986). Zjozjolí : gegevens over de volkskunde van Curaçao, Aruba en Bonaire [Zjozjolí: Data on the Folklore of Curaçao, Aruba, and Bonaire] (in Dutch). Willemstad, Curaçao: Instant Printing Services. OCLC 742063538.
- Dijkhoff, Marta; Pereira, Joyce (2010). "Language and education in Aruba Bonaire and Curaçao". Creoles in Education. John Benjamins B.V. pp. 237–272.
- Goslinga, Cornelis Ch. (1979). A Short History of the Netherlands Antilles and Surinam. doi:10.1007/978-94-009-9289-4. ISBN 978-90-247-2118-4.
- Nooyen, R.H. (1965). Millefiori di Aruba [Millefiori of Aruba] (in Papiamento). Oranjestad. OCLC 2270256.
- van Putte, Florimon (1999). Dede pikiña ku su bisiña: Papiamentu-Nederlands en de onverwerkt verleden tijd [Dede argues with her neighbor: Papiamento-Dutch and the unresolved past tense] (in Dutch). Walburg. ISBN 978-90-5730-074-5. OCLC 43565982.
