= Paardenbaai =

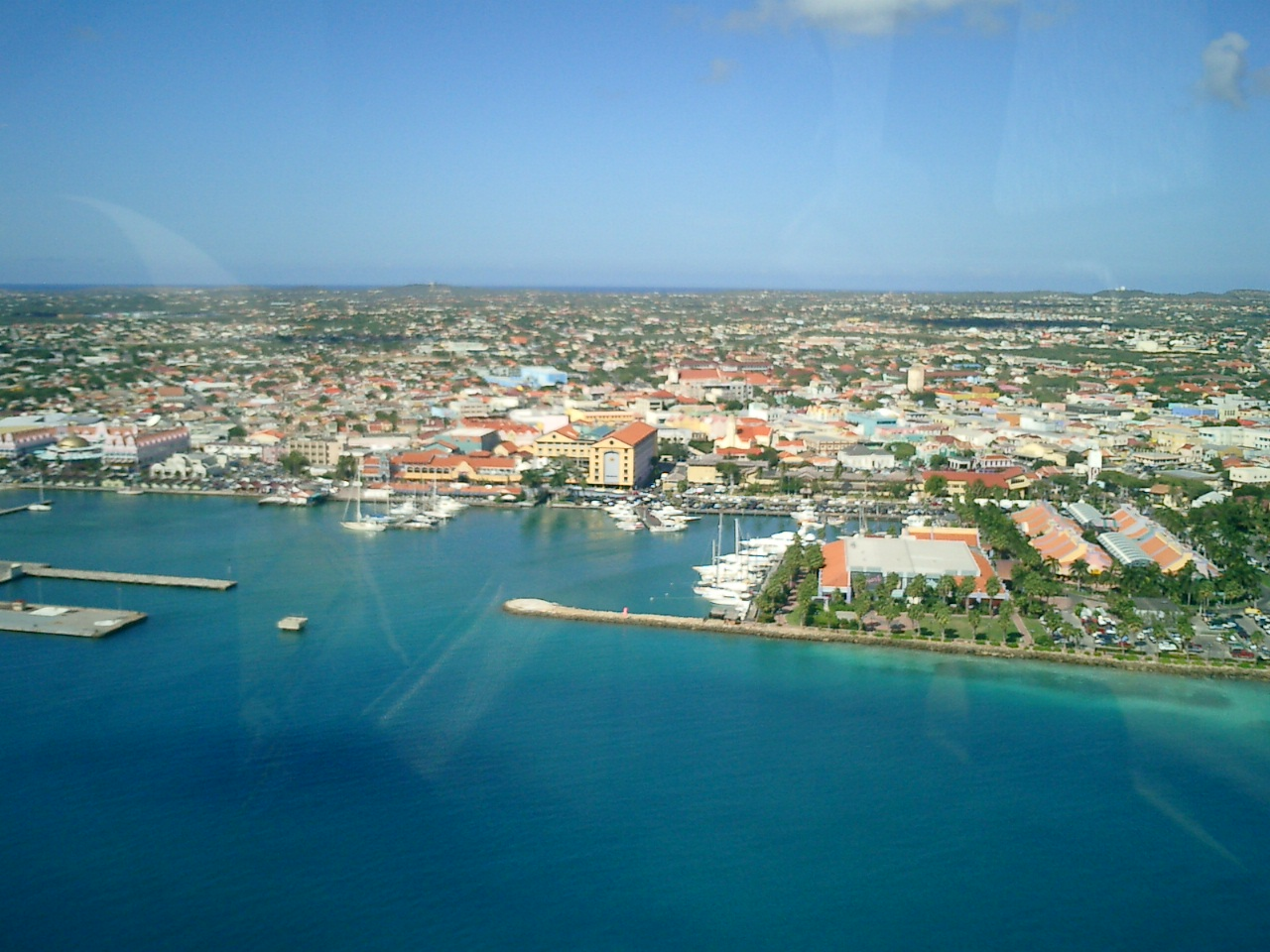
- Aerial view of Paardenbaai (2004)
- Interactive map of Paardenbaai
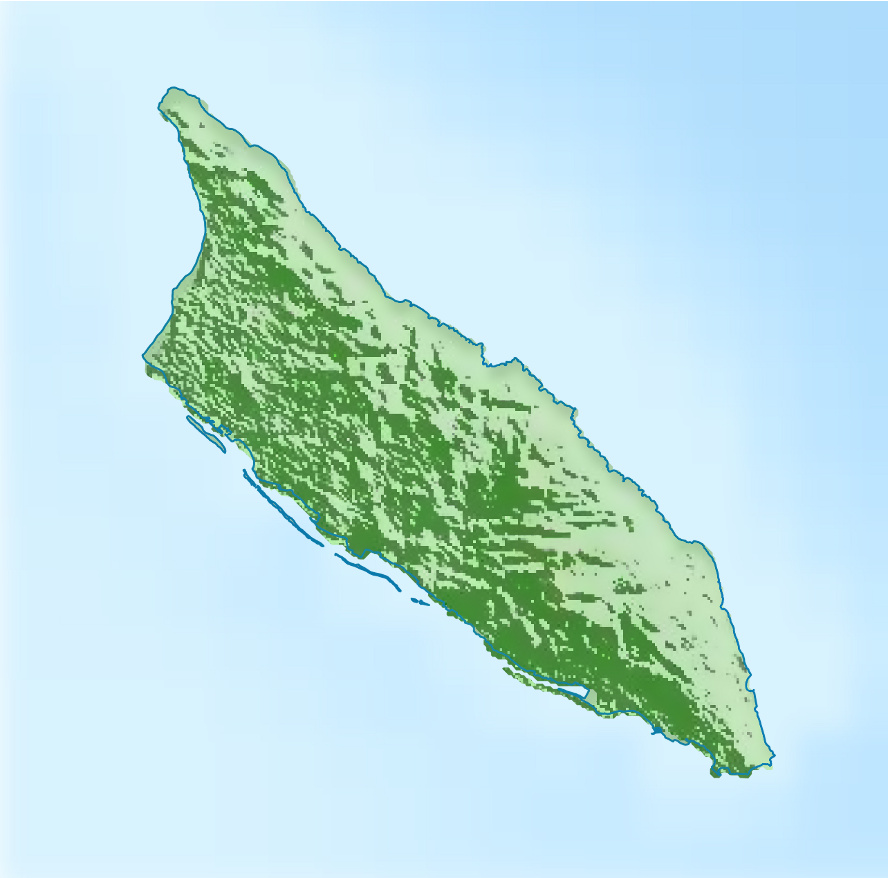
- Location in Aruba

Location
- Country: Aruba
- Location: Oranjestad, Aruba
- Coordinates: 12.51980°N 70.04225°W

Details
- Opened: 1796
- Operated by: Aruba Ports Authority
- No. of berths: 5

Paardenbaai (English: Bay of Horses) or Port of Oranjestad is the main seaport for passengers in Aruba. It is located in Oranjestad and has existed since 1796.

== History ==
In 1796, Fort Zoutman was constructed near Paardenbaai. It was a natural bay which was accessible to large ships. It was the second harbour on Aruba after Commandeurs Baai (Commander's Bay) in Savaneta. The bay later became known as Paardenbaai (Bay of Horses) because the harbour was mainly used to ship horses to Jamaica and other places. The village near the harbour had no name and was often referred to as Paardenbaai. In 1820, it was named Oranjestad.

In the 1920s, a part of the harbour was reclaimed to extend the city of Oranjestad. With this, the harbour is now partially located in Taratata. In 1928, Arend Petroleum Maatschappij, a subsidiary of Royal Dutch Shell, opened an oil refinery near the harbour. A wharf at the Taratata was used for the refinery, but turned out to be too small, therefore, a 420 metre long pier was constructed near Druif Beach. 8 kilometres of railway lines were laid to link the facilities. On February 16, 1942 there was also a World War II Attack on Aruba at this location. In 1953, Paardenbaai was expanded again with two large basins and completely used the Taratata grounds. The refinery closed in 1958. In 1974, the pier and the refinery were demolished and replaced by a tourist resort with a large beach. Eagle Beach is nowadays one of the busiest beaches of the island.

The harbour was large enough, however it used to be shared by cargo and cruise ships which often caused problems. It was decided to move cargo to Barcadera. The first priority was to move the container terminal. Work began in 2011, and the move was completed in 2015. In 2016, Barcadera was officially opened, and Paardenbaai became a harbour for passengers only.

Paardenbaai has five berths and is open all day and night. The tram of Oranjestad has a terminal at Port of Call which is located near the harbour.

== Bibliography ==
- Benjamins, Herman Daniël; Snelleman, Johannes (1917). Encyclopaedie van Nederlandsch West-Indië (in Dutch). Leiden: Martinus Nijhoff Publishers.
