= Arend Petroleum Company =

Oil refinery company (1927-1953)

Arend Petroleum Company Ltd. (1927–1953)
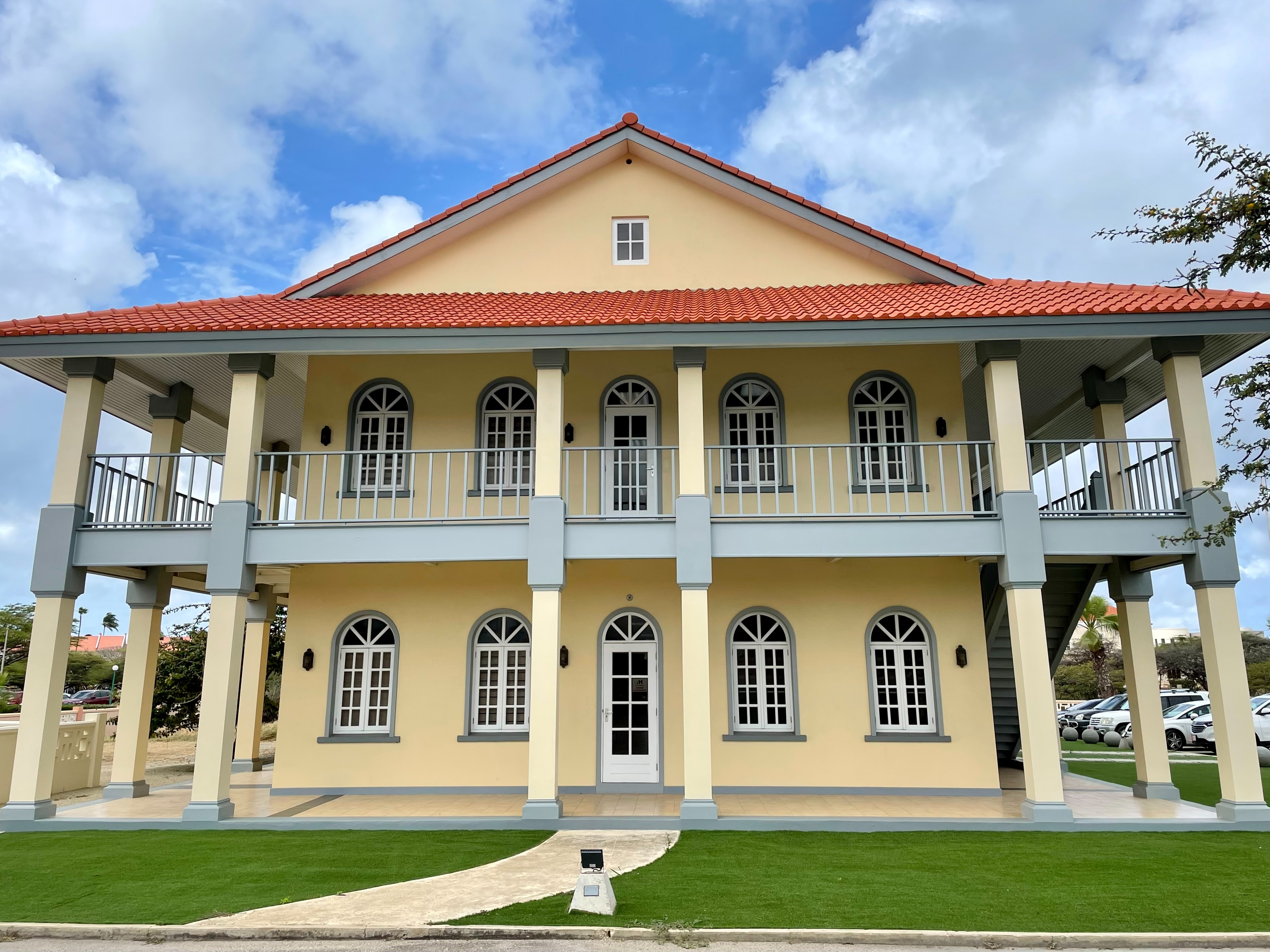
- Former headquarter (restored, 2021)
- Interactive map of the Arend Petroleum Company Ltd. (1927–1953) area

General information
- Location: L.G. Smith Boulevard 172, Eagle Beach, Aruba
- Coordinates: 12°32′1.3″N 70°3′12.2″W

Design and construction
- Architect: unknown
- Architecture firm: Construction office of the Royal Dutch Shell

Arend Petroleum Company Ltd.
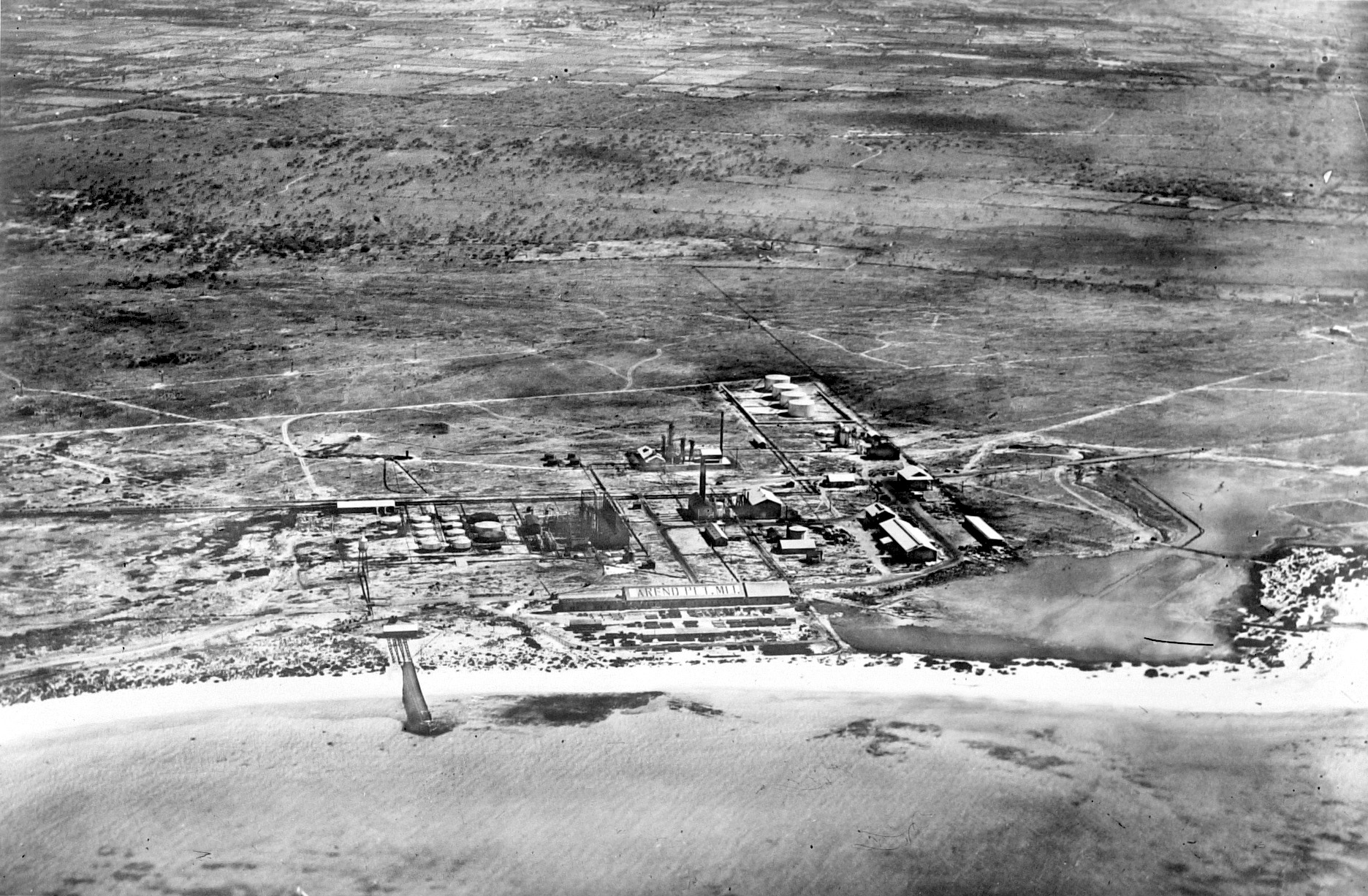
- Aerial view of the Arend Petroleum Company with the headquarter on the right-side
- Interactive map of Arend Petroleum Company Ltd.
- Location: Aruba

Refinery details
- Owner: Royal Dutch Shell Group
- Opened: 1927
- Closed: 1953
- No. of employees: 440
- No. of oil tanks: 34

The Arend Petroleum Company Ltd. was originally established in 1927 as "Compania Mexicana de Petrol el Aquila" on the island of Aruba. However, it underwent a name change and became more commonly known as "Arend" or "Eagle". The Arend was a subsidiary of the Royal Dutch Shell Group. The government generously granted a broad coastal strip at Druif Beach of approximately 5 kilometres (3.1 miles) in length.

== History ==
=== Oranjestad development ===
In 1927, a lively development started near Oranjestad, located on the coast of the island of Aruba. This development would ultimately have a significant influence on the daily life of this small town, bringing notable changes to employment opportunities for many residents and equally substantial changes to their prospects for livelihood.

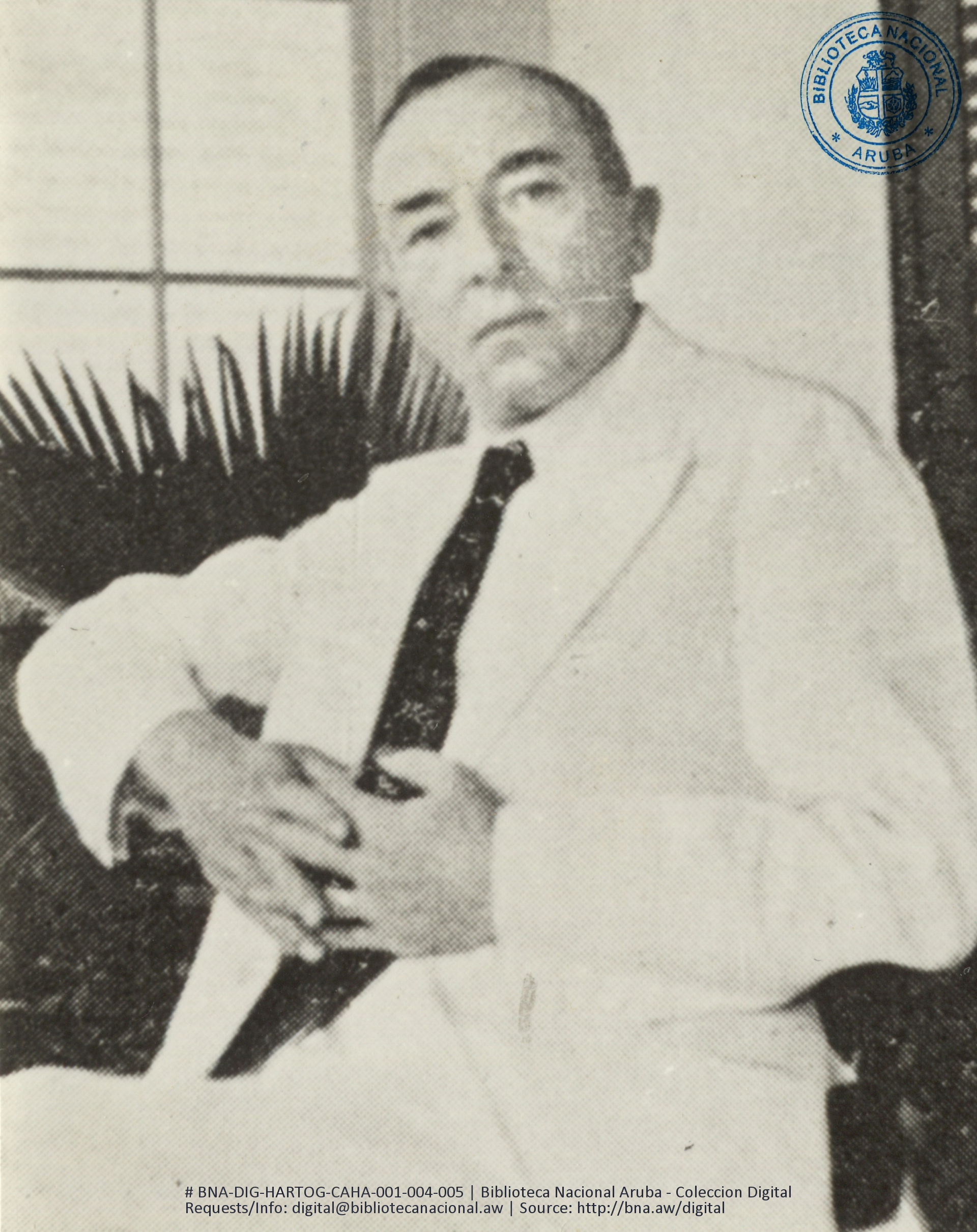
Isaac Wagemaker, lieutenant governor (1930)

Oranjestad underwent substantial transformation, becoming a densely populated city. It hosted three banks: the Dutch Bank for the West Indies (represented by John Eman), Curiël's Bank (represented by W. Craane), and Maduro's Bank (represented by Adriaan Laclé). Notable trading houses included Laclé, Arends, Debrot and Hart, Craane, Mansur, and Luis Posner. Ruiz' ice factory expanded and incorporated state-of-the-art machinery.

Both a public school and a Roman Catholic school were established. Besides Papiamento, it appeared that English was on the verge of surpassing Dutch as the dominant language.

Isaac Wagemaker served as the lieutenant governor of Aruba from 1928 to 1945, actively striving to ensure Aruba kept pace with the times.

=== Construction and infrastructure ===
To the west of Paardenbaai, cargo ships anchored, and a significant amount of construction material was transported from them to the shore using smaller boats called lighters. With this material, the construction of the Taratata Shipyard, which has become well known in Aruba, commenced as the first building project at the location.

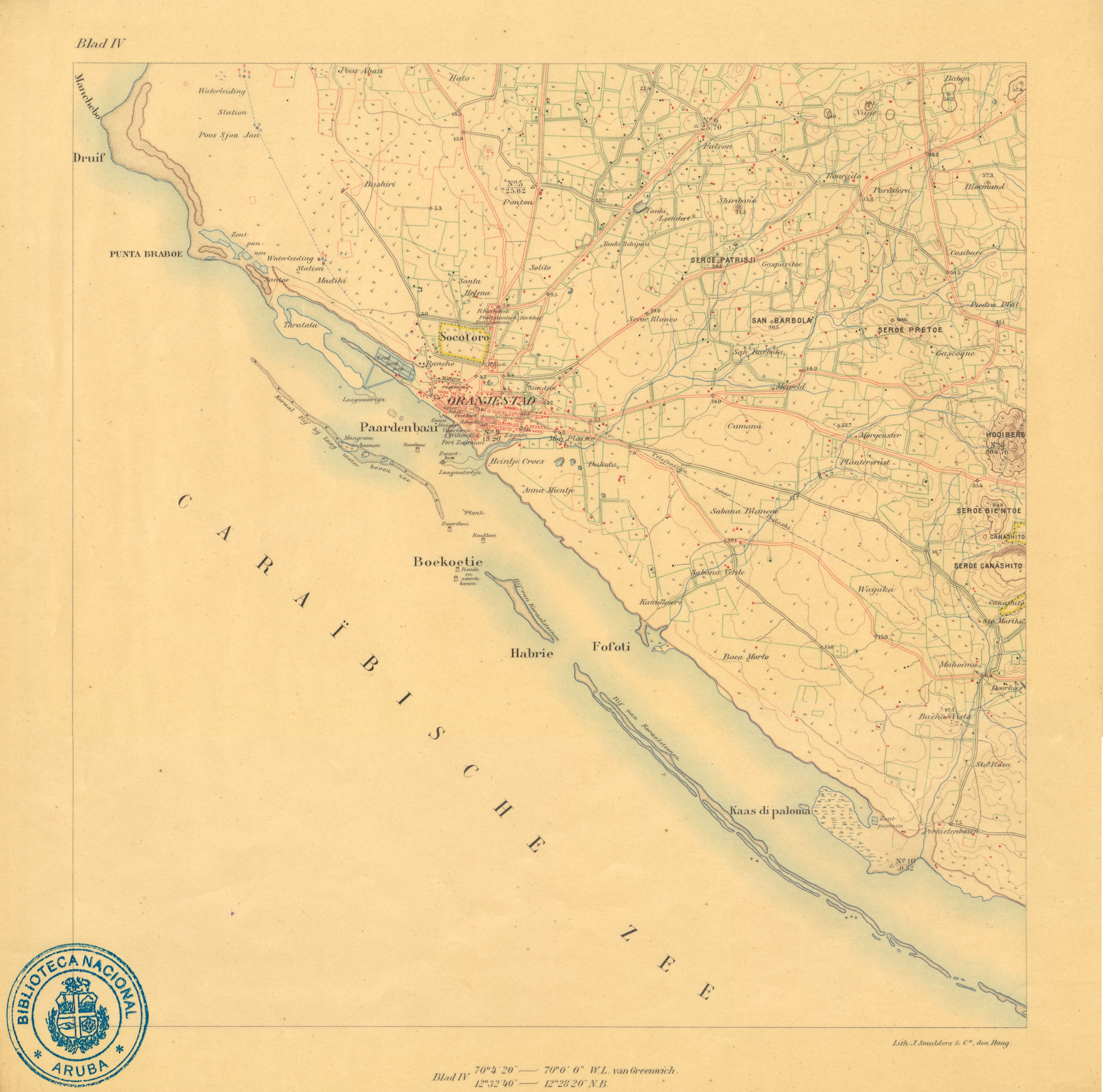
Former Taratata area west of Paardenbaai (1912)

Soon after the completion of the Taratata Shipyard, a continuous flow of essential heavy equipment for constructing an oil refinery, including tanks and an oil loading and unloading jetty, started arriving at the newly built dock from cargo ships.

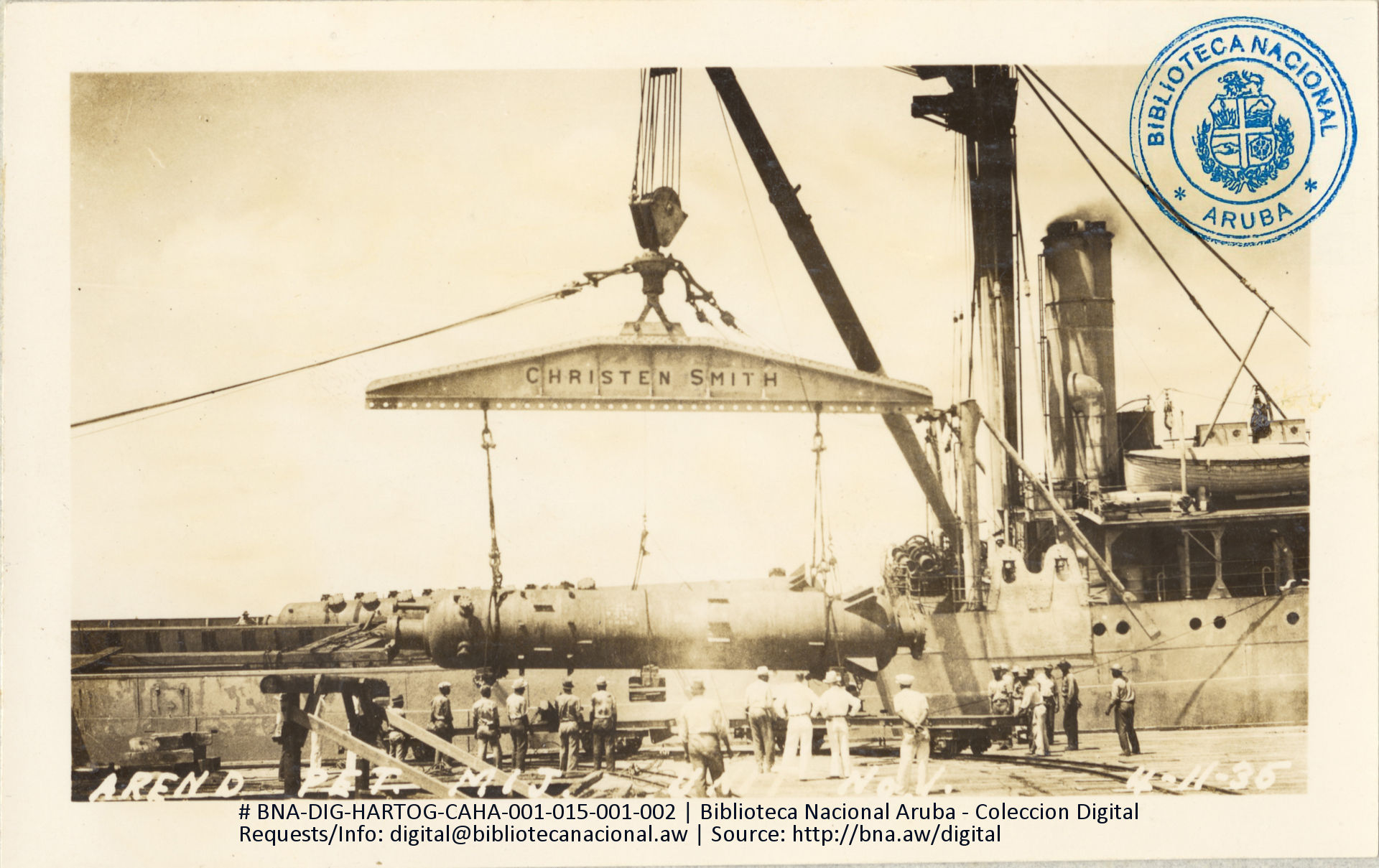
Unloading reaction chamber from steamer at former Taratata wharf

Similar to the neighboring island of Curaçao, Aruba is strategically positioned in relation to the abundant oil fields in Venezuela. The favorable location of the Arend Petroleum Company near Oranjestad was a direct result of this advantage. Additionally, the significant role played by the increasing global demand for oil products during the early 20th century further motivated this establishment.

A prominent coastal point, located approximately 2 kilometres (1.2 mi) west of the Taratata Shipyard, was chosen as the site for constructing an oil pier for the refinery. In early 1928, after completing the pier and the necessary pipeline system, the first shipment of crude oil from Venezuela arrived here for storage in the tanks of Arend Petroleum Company. These tanks had also been constructed further inland. The oil pier mentioned was a steel structure that extends 400 meters into the open sea in an "F" shape. It was specifically designed to handle two large ocean tankers for transporting processed oil products, as well as two small tanker ships called lake tankers for importing crude oil from Venezuela. This configuration allows for simultaneous loading and unloading operations to take place. At first, the construction personnel stayed in temporary sheds and tents on Druifbaai Beach while building the pier and refinery. As the company's residential houses were completed in the initial months, they relocated to the Eagle village situated between the factory site and Oranjestad.

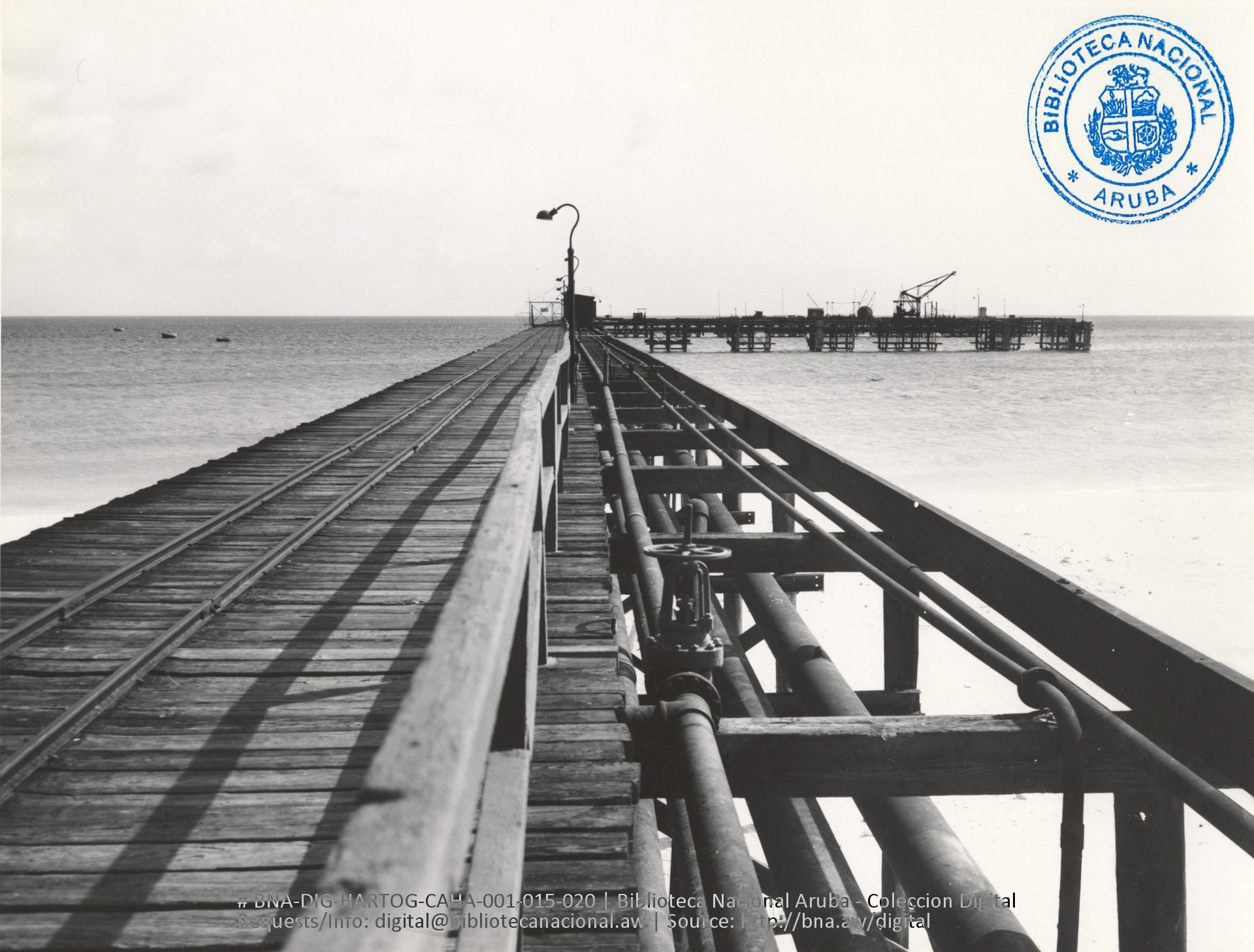
Ocean view. Railway F-shaped Eagle Pier

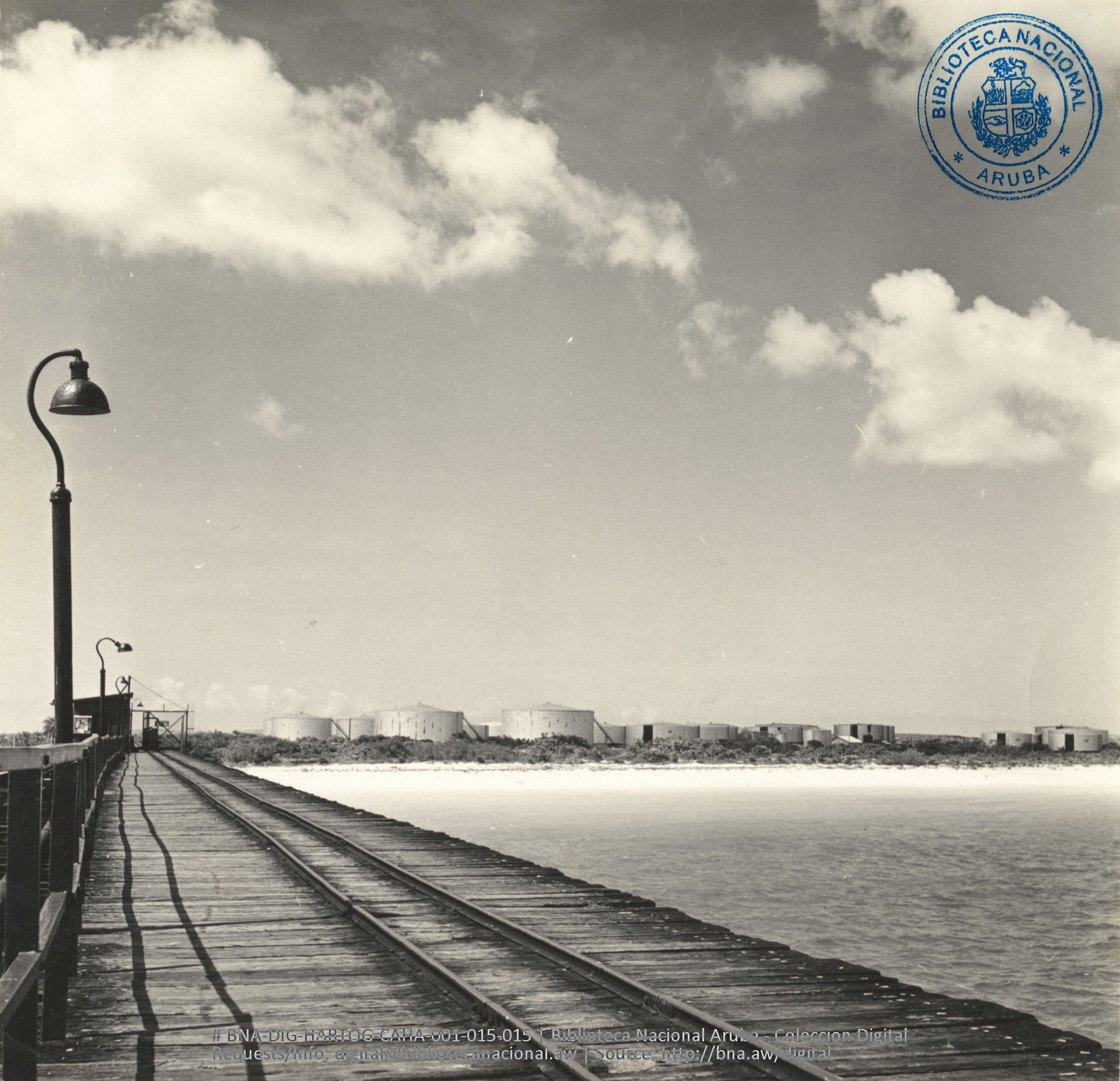
Shore view. Eagle Pier

=== Capacity ===
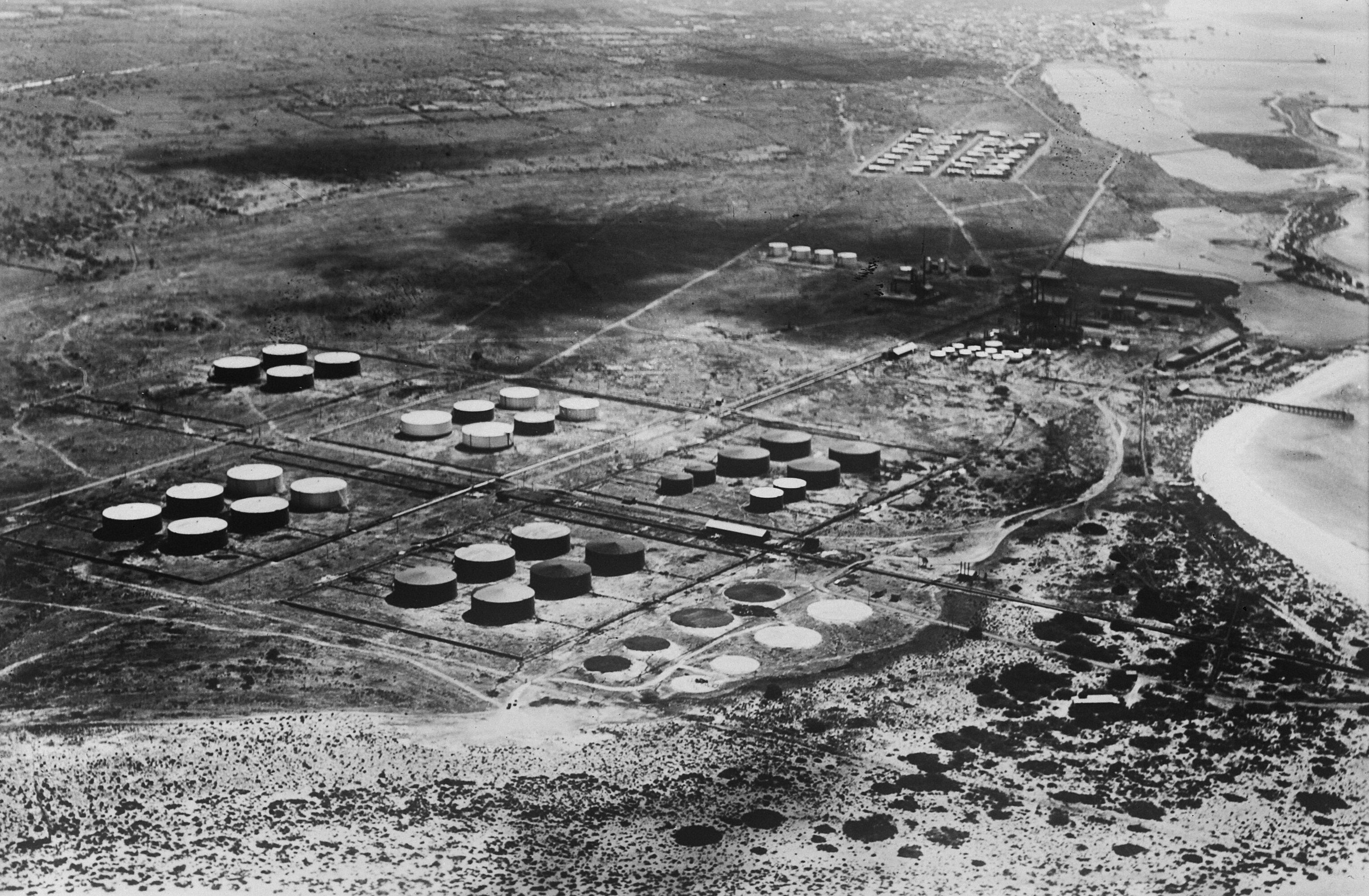
Aerial view of Storage tanks and village in the distance (upper-right) (1940–1945)

The refinery included a "Trumble" crude oil distillation facility (a less efficient and environmental friendly process than crude oil distillation unit (CDU)), a boiler house for steam supply, an electric power plant for lighting and power generation, an oxygen and ice factory, as well as necessary pumping installations, warehouses, workshops, office spaces, and several oil storage tanks with a total capacity of 350,000 cubic metres (12,000,000 cu ft). After intensive work, the refinery was finished in the early months of 1928. It was put into operation in May of that year, showing promising results. Shortly thereafter, it achieved a processing capacity of 3,000 tons of crude oil per day, producing fuel oil, gas oil, diesel oil, and gasoline. Three tanker ships, each with a capacity of 2600 tons, were developed for transporting crude oil from oil fields around Lake Maracaibo to Aruba. After the refinery and fleet were put into operation, marking the completion of the initial construction phase of Arend Petroleum Company, the production remained at its full capacity for the following seven years as described earlier.

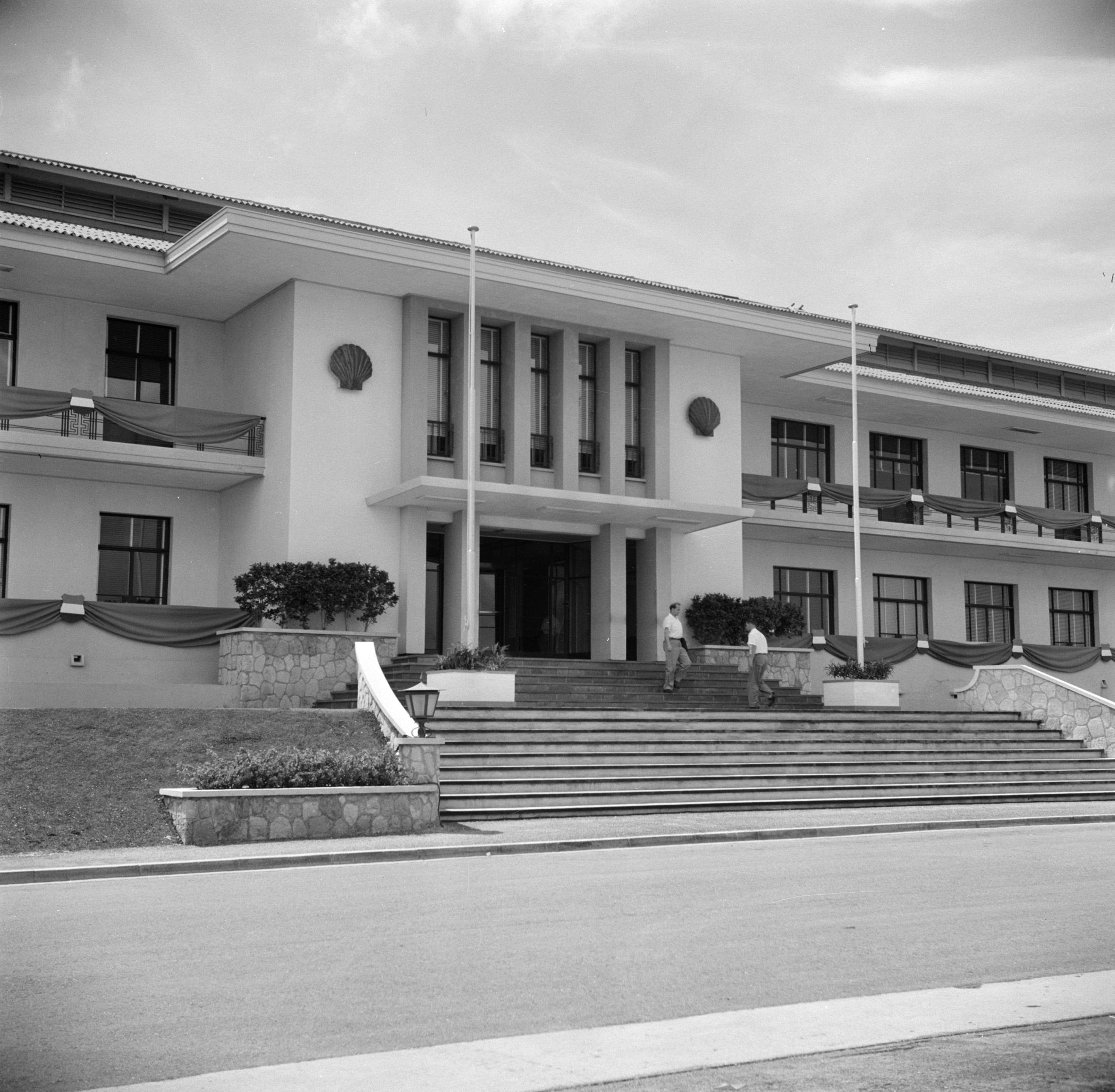
Headquarter of CPIM in Curaçao (1955)

However, in 1935, there were some changes. The expansions undertaken by Curaçao Petroleum Industries Company Ltd. (CPIM) and Lago Oil and Transport Company Ltd. in Curacao and Aruba, respectively, led to a slight decrease in the supply of crude oil to the smaller "Arend" refinery. From 1935 to 1938, the company had to adjust to more modest processing and could not always operate at its maximum capacity.

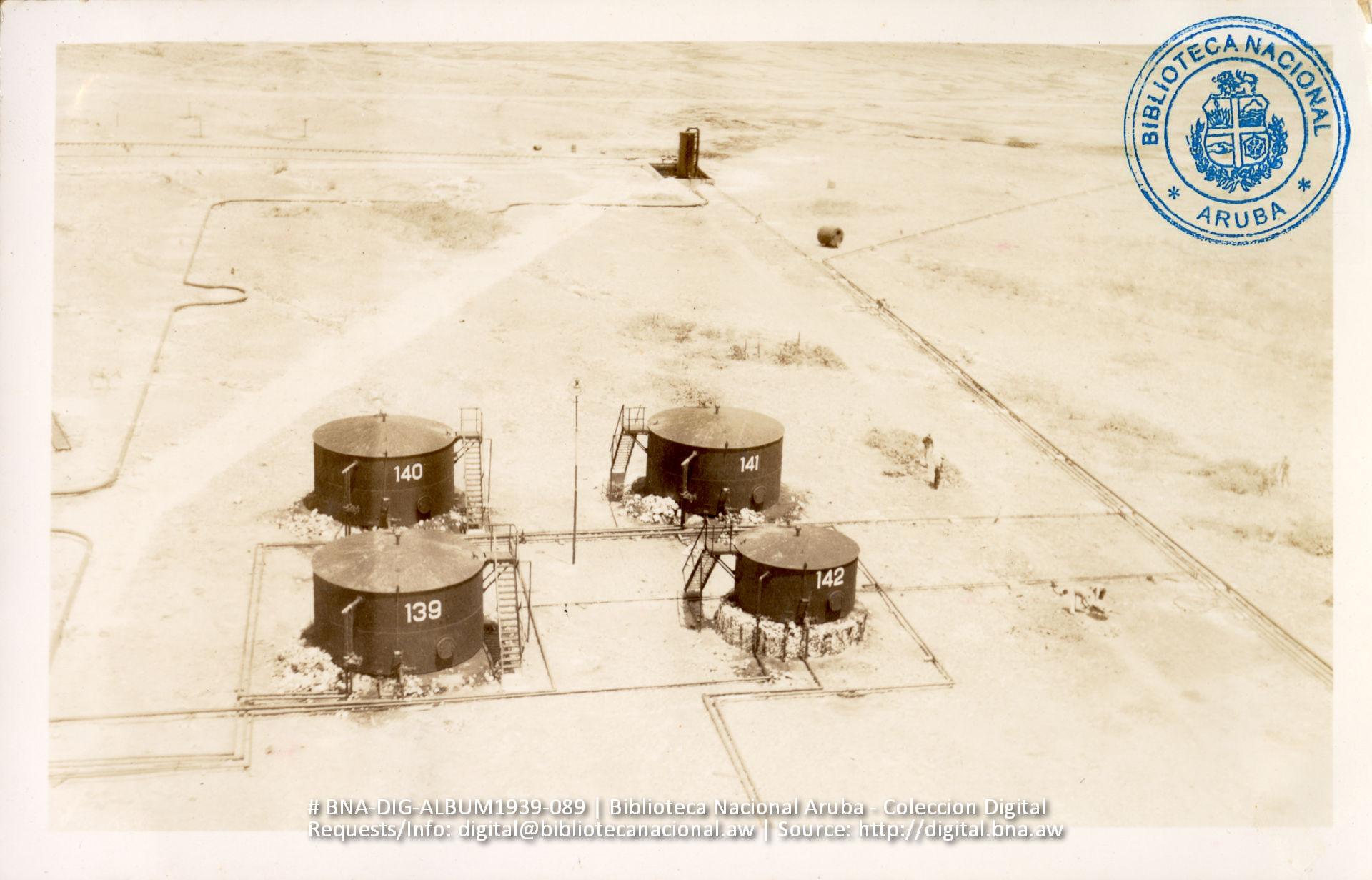
Cracking installation (1935)

In order to meet the growing global demand for a wider range of end products, the refinery underwent an expansion in 1935. Alongside the existing Trumble distillation facility, a cracking unit was built. In the subsequent years, from 1936 to 1938, the tank storage facility was also expanded to accommodate larger quantities and a greater variety of products, resulting in a total storage capacity of over 700,000 cubic metres (25,000,000 cu ft). By early 1939, a more consistent supply of crude oil was achieved, allowing the company to operate at full capacity once again. This momentum continued until the end of 1942. Following the onset of World War II, the production of Arend Petroleum Company was progressively oriented towards meeting the high demand for oil in wartime activities.

=== Attack on Druif/Eagle beach ===
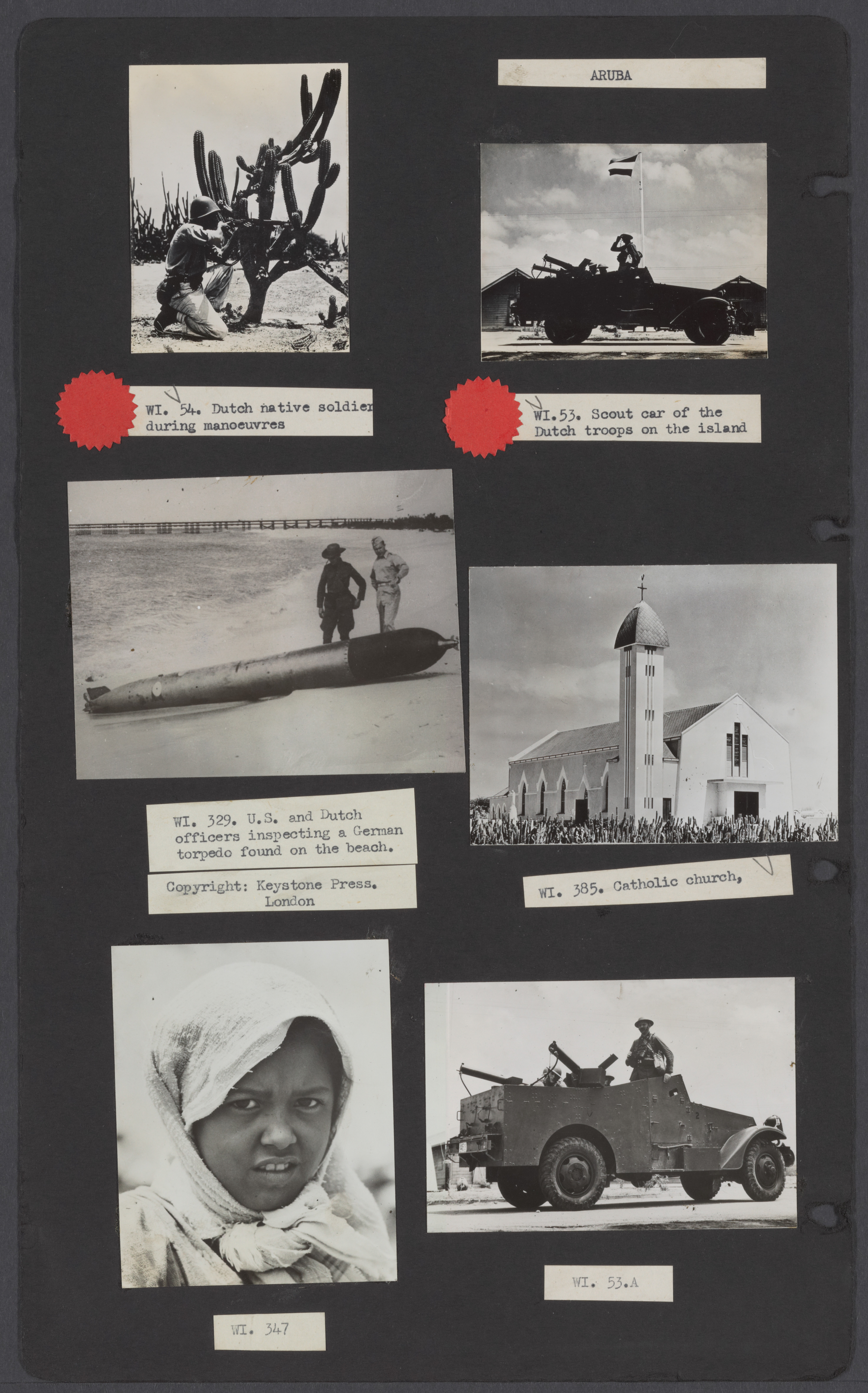
WI 329 – Captain Robert Briskin of the US army (right) and a Dutch officer inspecting a German torpedo found on the beach near Eagle Pier (17 February 1942)

During the third year of the war, on a dark night on February 16, 1942, Aruba was attacked by a German submarines U-156. The assailant targeted several ships near the island and at the piers of the oil companies operating in Aruba, causing considerable damage. A German torpedo struck an American vessel at the "Arend" pier, but the ship had been emptied of gas. Despite sustaining significant damage, it remained afloat without catching fire. Another torpedo landed on the Druif/Eagle beach near the saltwater pumping house of the refinery. On February 17, Captain Robert Briskin of the US army and a Dutch officer inspected the torpedo, and authorities determined it to be a dud. However, when Dutch experts attempted to dismantle the torpedo, it unexpectedly exploded, claiming the lives of four Dutch Navy marines. Among the brave marines who died were Leonardus Kooijman, Johannes Vogelezang, Pieter Joosse, and Dirk Adriaan Cornelis de Maagd. The fishermen of Oranjestad set sail in their boats during the attack and rescued numerous survivors from the impacted tanker ships, ensuring their safe return to land.

=== Temporary closure ===
In late 1942, due to practical reasons, the decision was made to temporarily close down the oil processing facilities of the "Arend" refinery. The demands of wartime operations necessitated a greater supply of various aviation fuels, which this refinery lacked the necessary equipment to produce. Therefore, priority was to refineries that had the required facilities. As a result, all available crude oil from Venezuela was redirected to these refineries, ensuring maximum production of the essential oil products needed for the war effort. Consequently, the affected employees found temporary employment at the CPIM in Curaçao and the Lago Oil Transport Company Ltd in Aruba, where their skills were effectively utilized to support the increased wartime production.

Nonetheless, The Arend storage and shipping facilities played a crucial role as a transit point for temporary storage and transshipment of crude oil and finished products. Nearby oil companies, CPIM and Lago, highly values this extra storage space. With the war progressing favorably, the refinery anticipated reopening in early 1945. Personnel eagerly returned as the facilities were fully restored within a month. Work resumed without interruption or reduced capacity. Some tanks were relocated to Venezuela and Colombia due to decreased post-war demand. Nevertheless, the Arend still maintained a strorage capacity of 350,000,000 liters (92,000,000 U.S. gal).

=== Eagle village facilities ===
At that time, the number of employees in the Arend company amounted to 440 people, of whom about forty, due to their nature of their work, resided with their families in the company houses in the Eagle village, in close proximity to the facilities. The workforce mainly consisted of Aruban workers who resided across the entire island and commute to work daily by truck. The majority of the office consisted of Englishmen.

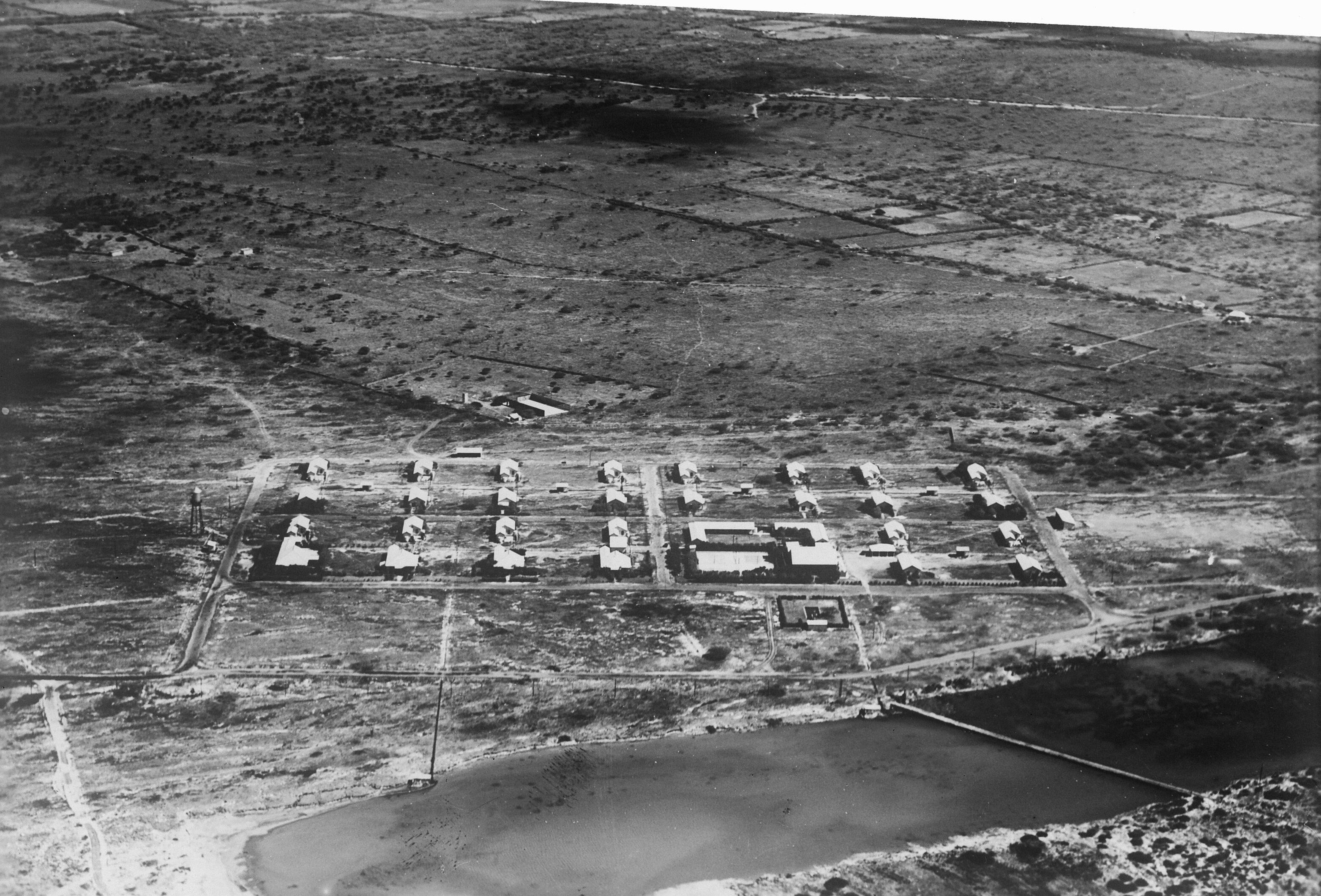
Aerial view. Eagle village, a residential area near the refinery (1940–1945)

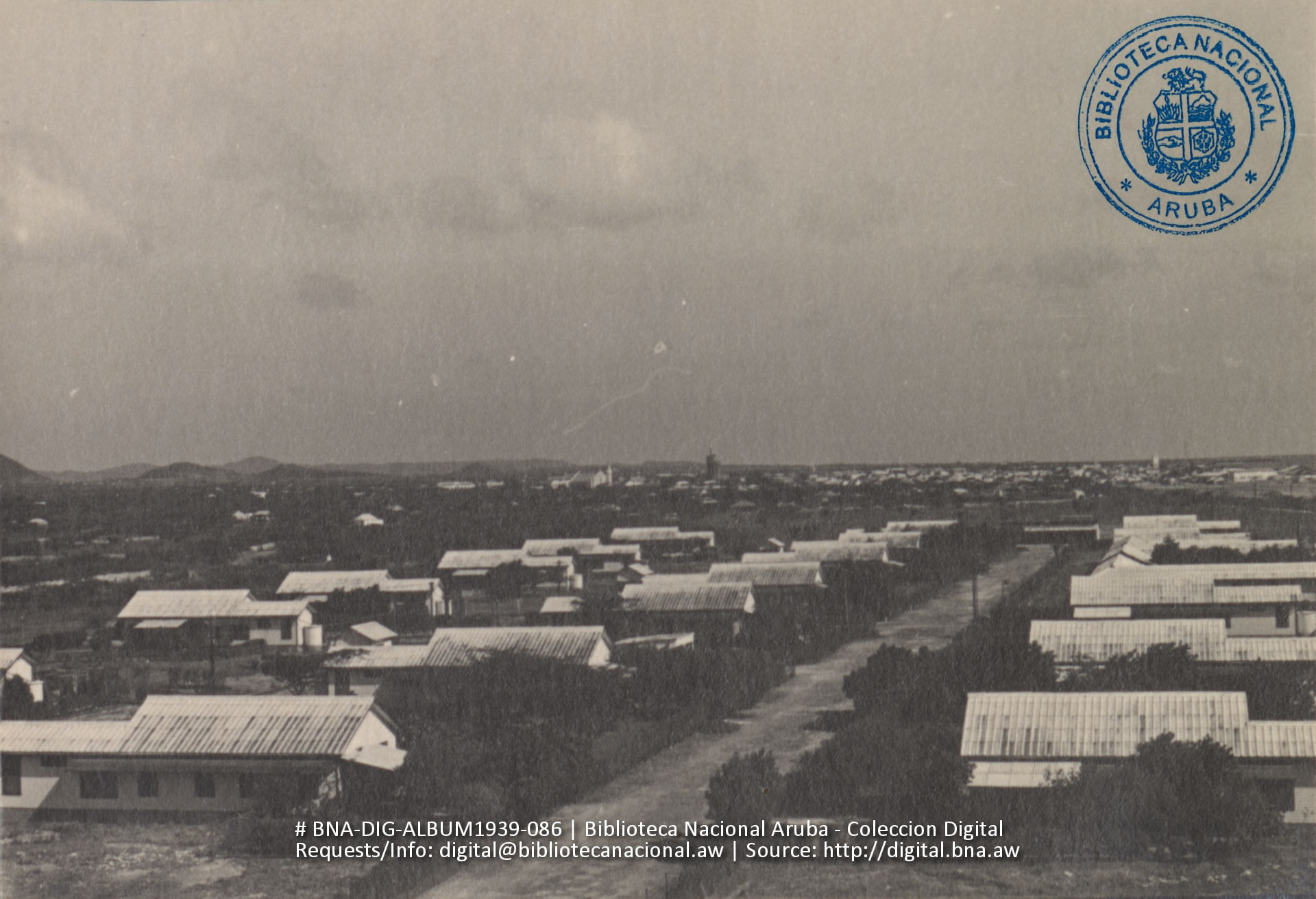
Houses at Eagle/Arend Camp (1935)

Eagle Village was located about one kilometer east of Punta Braboe. The area consisted of approximately 24 houses that were constructed. The houses were wooden bungalows, arranged around their own clubhouse, which has been the center of gatherings and various festivities since the establishment of the company. Furthermore, the company provided tennis courts, an outdoor cinema, a swimming pool, a golf course, and a sport field for employees in this area.

Initially, the company managed its own hospital for its personnel, but since the reopening in 1945, this arrangement had been discontinued, but a company clinic was available, while any other necessary hospital care was provided at the San Pedro Hospital in Aruba.

Since its establishment, the Arend has been responsible for the electricity supply of nearby Oranjestad.

== Architectural design ==
The former headquarters' architecture incorporates elements from the building styles used in the former Dutch East Indies, including encompassing covered verandas and expansive roof overhangs. Additionally, the construction displays features reminiscent of English architectural styles found in the Leeward Islands and the southern United States.

The architect responsible for the design of the building is unidentified. However, it is plausible that they had a background in the construction department of the Royal Dutch Shell, considering the presence of colonial architectural elements. In a letter dated April 19, 1929, the lieutenant governor mentioned the visit of an engineer named Abelard Soray to the Director of Public Works in Curaçao. Soray was described as having extensive knowledge in house construction, urban planning, and road development, and had previously worked for the Arend Company from 1927 to 1928. It is possible that Soray was the architect behind Arend's headquarters.

Former headquarters

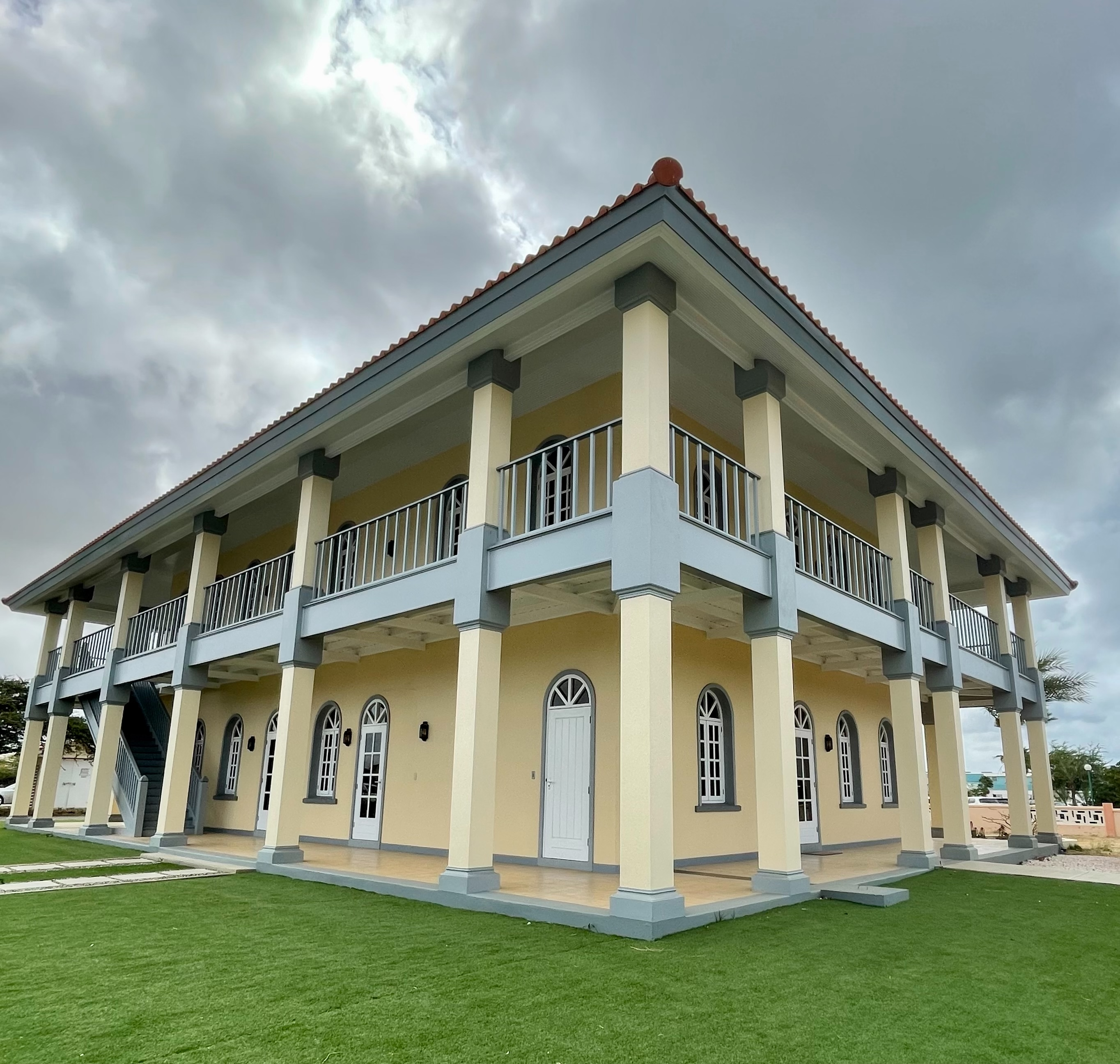
Side view of former headquarter of Arend Petroleum Company

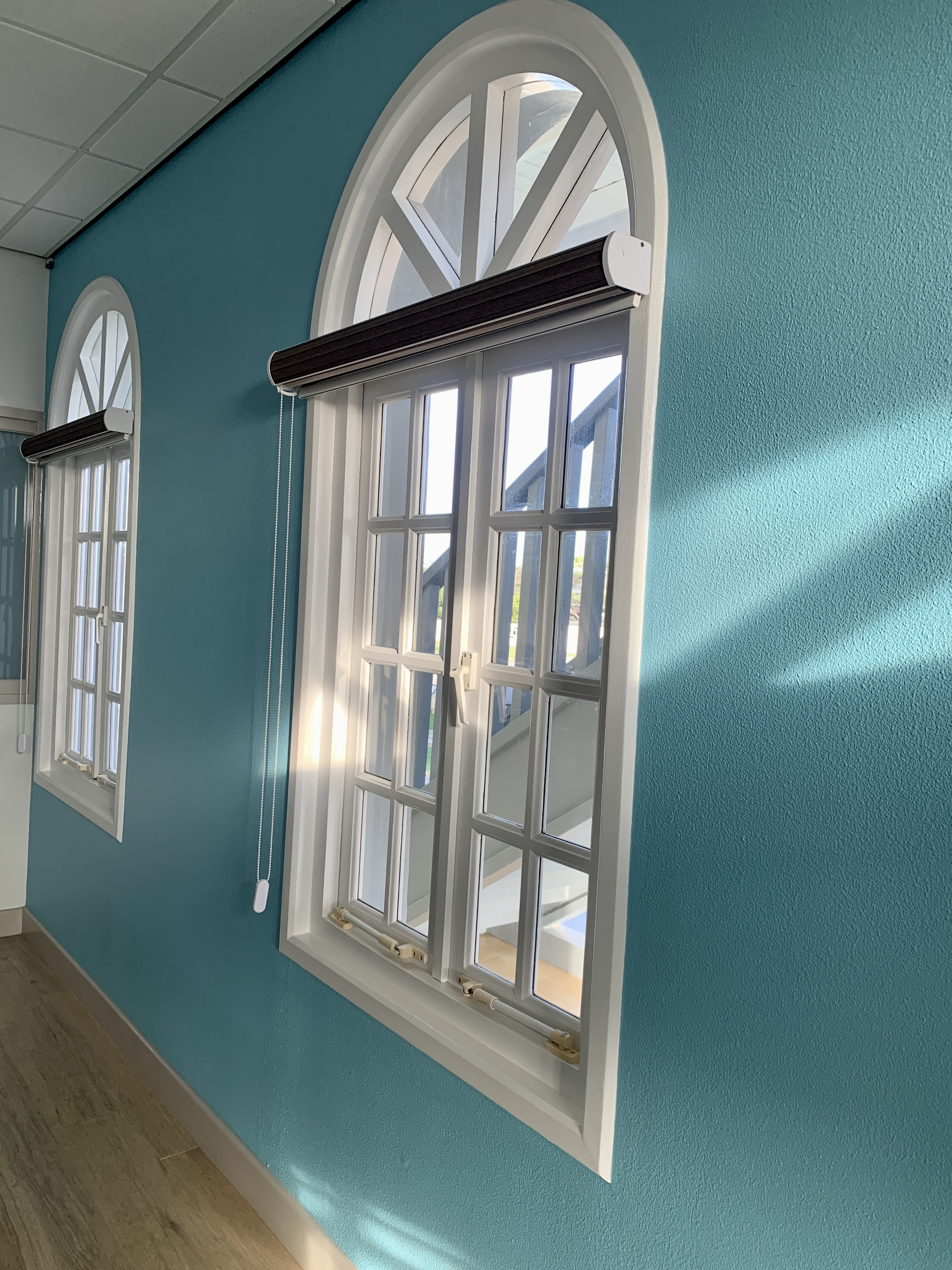
Interior view of window

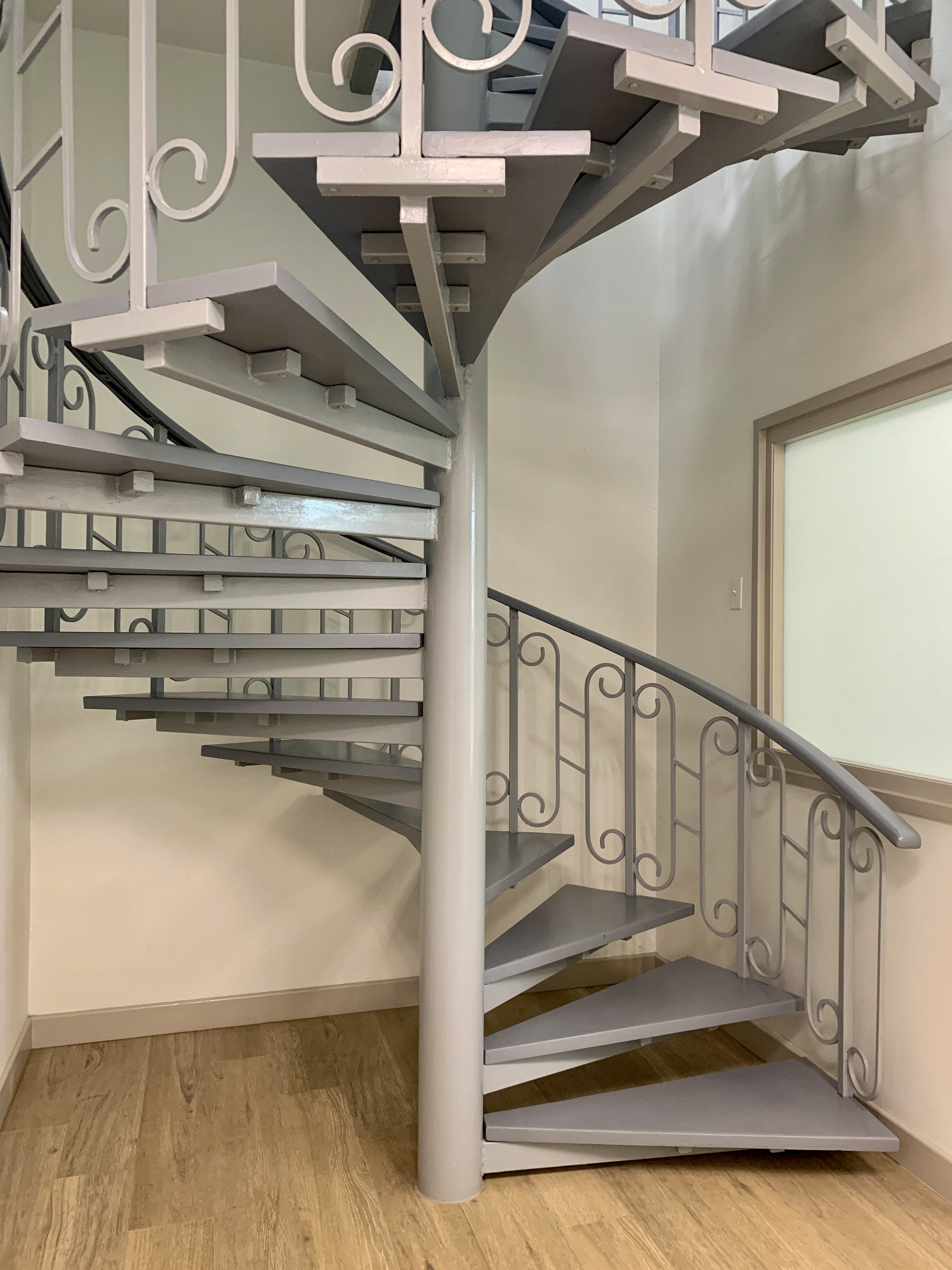
Interior view staircase

== See also ==
- List of monuments of Aruba
- Economy of Aruba
- Lago Oil and Transport Company
- Lago Colony
- Attack on Aruba
- Operation Neuland

== Sources ==
=== Book ===
- Alofs, L. (2001). Ken ta Arubiano?: sociale integratie en natievorming op Aruba 1924-2001 [Who is Aruban?: social integration and nation development on Aruba] (in Dutch). Aruba: VAD/De Wit Stores. ISBN 9789990481105.
- Balen, W.J. (1938). Ons Gebiedsdeel Curaçao [Our territorial unit Curaçao] (in Dutch). Haarlem: Tjeenk Willink.
- Kock, A.D. (2012). The torpedo incident at Eagle Beach in Aruba. Aruba: Kock, A.D.
- Klooster, O. van der; Bakker, M. (2013). Monumentengids Aruba [Monument guide Aruba]. Amsterdam: KIT Publisher. ISBN 9789460222207. OCLC 1280879864.
- Zwan, J. van der; Merryweather, S. (1948). "N.V. Arend Petroleum Maatschappij" [Arend Petroleum Company Ltd.]. Oranje en de zes Caraibische parelen : officieel gedenkboek ter gelegenheid van het gouden regeringsjubileum van hare majesteit Koningin Wilhelmina Helena [Orange and the Six Caribbean Pearls: Official Commemorative Book on the Occasion of the Golden Reign Jubilee of Her Majesty Queen Wilhelmina Helena.] (in Dutch). Amsterdam: De Bussy. pp. 445–448. OCLC 906322310.

=== Journal ===
- Herdigein, H.E. (1931). "Eenige aantekeningen omtrent Aruba" [Some notes about Aruba]. New West Indian Guide / Nieuwe West-Indische Gids. 12 (1): 301–302. doi:10.1163/22134360-90001163.
- Thompson, N.W. (1918). "The Trumbling Refining Process: A new departure in the methods of oil distilling, effecting a marked saving in the percentage of oil required as fuel". Journal of the American Society for Naval Engineers. 30 (2): 364–370. doi:10.1111/j.1559-3584.1918.tb02501.x.

=== Website ===
- "Leonardus Kooijman (1916-1942)". Oorlogs Graven Stichting.
- "Dirk Adriaan Cornelis de Maagd (1894-1942)". Oorlogs Graven Stichting.
- "Johannes Vogelezang (1916-1942)". Oorlogs Graven Stichting.
- "Pieter Joosse (1912-1942)". Oorlogs Graven Stichting.
