= SS Pedernales =

Lake tanker damaged by a torpedo at Aruba, part of the ships remains as dive site

History
- Name: 1938: Pedernales; 1957: Esso Pedernales; 1958: Katendrecht
- Owner: Lago Oil and Transport Company (Esso)
- Port of registry: London
- Builder: Cantiere Riuniti dell´Adriatico; Monfalcone, Italy
- Launched: 14 July 1938
- Completed: September 1938
- Refit: after torpedo attack on 16 February 1942
- Homeport: London
- Fate: broken up at Rotterdam, October 1959

General characteristics
- Type: oil tanker
- Tonnage: 4,317 GRT
- Crew: 26

SS Pedernales was a lake tanker of the World War II and post war eras. She was built in 1938 in Monfalcone, Italy, and sailed under the British flag. Pedernales was severely damaged in a torpedo attack on 16 February 1942 while anchored at Aruba.

The damaged ship was cut into three sections. The fore and aft sections were joined, and the ship made her way to Baltimore, Maryland, to be rebuilt. The middle section was left in Aruba and, after being used for a number of years as a target by Dutch gunners after the war, has become a scuba diving site.

The rebuilt portion of the tanker, later renamed Esso Pedernales and Katendrecht, was scrapped in 1959.

== Career ==
SS Pedernales was completed in September 1938 by Cantieri Riuniti dell'Adriatico of Monfalcone, Italy. She operated as a lake tanker, sailing from Lake Maracaibo in Venezuela to the refinery at Aruba.

On the morning of 16 February 1942, U-156, under the command of Kapitänleutnant Werner Hartenstein, commenced an attack on oil tankers at anchor in San Nicolas Harbor in Aruba as part of Operation Neuland. Among other ships, Pedernales was torpedoed and damaged; it was later beached by two tugs and abandoned.

Later, the hulk was towed to the Lago Dry Dock on Aruba where she was cut into three sections. The fore and aft sections were joined and the ship made way under her own power to Baltimore, Maryland, where she had a new midsection installed, and continued her career.

After the end of World War II, the tanker continued sailing under her same name until 1957 when she was renamed Esso Pedernales. After another renaming the following year to Katendrecht, she was scrapped at Rotterdam in 1959.

== Wreck ==
The damaged middle section of Pedernales was towed away from the dry dock and was used for many years as a target by Dutch Navy aircraft. The bombing practice scattered the remnants of the wreck into eight sections of wreckage. Portions of the wreck are a popular scuba diving attraction. The three largest sections of the wreck are used daily by local dive operators. The remnants rest in 25 feet (7.6 m) of water at 12.57889°N 070.05833°W.
