= Attack on Aruba =

World War II battle in the Caribbean

- Part of World War II, Battle of the Caribbean
- Pedernales, severely damaged after being struck by a German torpedo.
Date	16 February 1942
Location	off Oranjestad, San Nicolaas Harbor, Aruba, Caribbean Sea, Gulf of Venezuela
Result	Axis victory

Belligerents
Netherlands; United States	(Nazi Germany) Germany (Fascist Italy) Italy

Commanders and leaders
Frank Andrews	Werner Hartenstein

Strength
Land: ~300 artillery ~6 artillery pieces 3 shore batteries Sea: ~3 patrol boats Air: 2 light bombers	7 submarines

Casualties and losses
~51 killed 6 tankers sunk 2 tankers damaged	1 killed 1 wounded 1 submarine damaged
- German casualties were caused by an accident.

The attack on Aruba was an attack on oil installations and tankers by Axis submarines during World War II. On 16 February 1942, a German U-boat attacked the small Dutch island of Aruba. Other submarines patrolled the area for shipping and they sank or damaged tankers. Aruba was home to two of the largest oil refineries in the world during the war against the Axis powers, the Arend Petroleum Company, situated near the Oranjestad harbor, and the Lago Oil and Transport Company at the San Nicolas harbor. The attack resulted in the disruption of vital Allied fuel production.

== Background ==
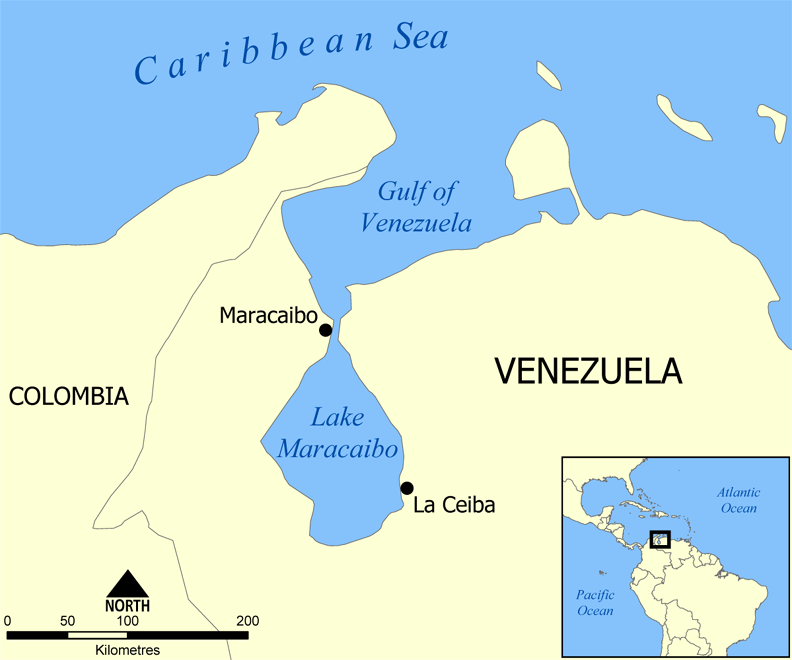
The Gulf of Venezuela; Aruba is located just northeast of the gulf.

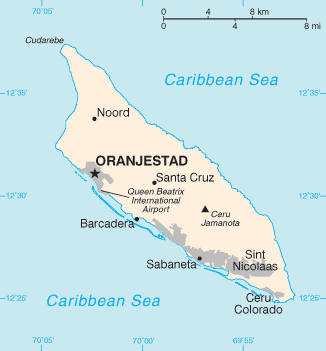
Aruba in the Caribbean Sea.

The Dutch island of Aruba had two major oil installations. The production of aviation fuel had been expanded to supply British requirements prior to the American entry into the war. It was the largest such refinery in the world and a strategic target.

In early 1942, several Axis submarines patrolled the southern Caribbean with the objective of attacking Allied convoys and disrupting the oil operations. U-156, a long range submarine, entered the waters off southwestern Aruba on 13 February. She was under the command of Commander Werner Hartenstein who wanted a reconnaissance of the area before attacking the Lago Company oil tanks near Oranjestad. Hartenstein commanded the Neuland Gruppe, a wolfpack of five German and two Italian submarines.

Previously the commander had coordinated an attack on oil-related targets in between Aruba and Maracaibo in order to disrupt the production of aviation fuel. U-156 was assigned to attack the refineries, while the six other submarines attacked merchant ships wherever found. These other submarines were U-502, U-67, U-129 and U-161 and two Italian submarines. They patrolled the Gulf of Venezuela, to the southwest of Aruba, and other nearby waters for oil tankers.

== Attack ==
On 16 February, after observing the area for a few days, U-156 came around to the refineries. There in front of her target were two Lago Company steamers, SS Pedernales and Oranjestad, both British owned oilers. At 01:31, U-156 surfaced in San Nicholas Harbor some 1.5 km (0.81 nmi; 0.93 mi) offshore and attacked the two British tankers at anchor. Hartenstein ordered the firing of one torpedo from his bow tubes at Pedernales. The torpedo attack was successful and Pedernales was hit amidship. Loaded with crude oil, the steamer immediately burst into flames, killing eight of her 26 crewmen and wounding her captain Herbert McCall. Oranjestad then began to lift anchor and steam away but she was too late and was hit by a second torpedo fired from U-156. She too burst into flames and an hour later, sank in about 70 m (230 ft) of water. Fifteen of her 22 crewmen were killed. At this time, several Dutch sailors flocked to their small wooden patrol craft at harbor in order to get them away from the burning oil of the tankers.

At 03:13, U-156 attacked the Texaco owned tanker SS Arkansas which was berthed at Eagle Beach next to the Arend/Eagle Refinery. Just one of the torpedoes struck Arkansas and partially sank her but the damage was moderate and caused no casualties. Commander Hartenstein then steamed further around Aruba and directed his men to take to the deck guns and prepare for a naval bombardment of the large oil tank in view. The crew of the 105 mm (4.1 in) gun forgot to remove the water cap from the barrel, so when Hartenstein ordered them to fire, the gun blew up in the faces of the two gunners. Gunnery Officer Dietrich von dem Borne was wounded badly, one foot having been severed. His comrade and trigger man Heinrich Büssinger was badly wounded as well and died several hours after the attack. Hartenstein ordered the 37 mm (1.46 in) flak gun to continue the attack.

Sixteen rounds from the 37mm AA gun were fired, but only two hits were found by the Allies: a dent in an oil storage tank and a hole in a house. Hartenstein ordered a cease-fire, and set his course toward the other end of the island. En route, U-156 was found and attacked by a Fokker F.XVIII maritime patrol aircraft of the Netherlands West Indies Defense Force which took off from Oranjestad, Aruba at 05.55 hours and dropped a number of 8 kg (18 lb) or 80 mm improvised anti-submarine bombs without achieving a hit. The U-boat continued towards Oranjestad harbor and at 09.43 hours torpedoed Arkansas lying at the pier of the Eagle Refinery, after missing with two torpedoes.

Meanwhile, the six other Axis boats patrolled the area in search of oil tankers. U-502 under Lieutenant Commander Jürgen von Rosenstiel made contact with at least three Allied vessels that day in the Gulf of Venezuela, two British oilers, SS Tia Juana and SS San Nicolas. were sunk along with the Venezuelan steamer Monagas. U-67, under Captain Günther Müller-Stöckheim, attacked two additional tankers off Curaçao that morning. Stockheim fired four torpedoes from his bow tubes at the tankers in Willemstad Harbor. All four failed to hit their targets or failed to explode. Stockheim tried again and fired two more torpedoes from his stern tubes at the Dutch Rafaela; one hit and heavily damaged the ship. U-67 then slipped away, unaware a United States Army Air Corps A-20 Havoc light bomber was in pursuit. The aircraft dropped its payload of both flares and explosives when over the surfaced U-boat but the bombs missed and U-67 submerged and got away. The flames from burning steamers around Aruba were reportedly so large that they could be seen easily from Curaçao.

The four other U-boats and submarines were apparently unsuccessful in engaging Allied ships that morning. The Dutch patrol boats did not engage either.

== Aftermath ==
After the attack, the Axis force steamed for Martinique, where they offloaded their two casualties for medical treatment. Four Allied ships had been sunk accounting for 14,149 tons. Pedernales, Arkansas and Rafaela survived the encounter; although damaged or sunk, they were repaired and put back to use transporting goods for the Allied war effort. During U-156's attack on Arkansas, one of the missed torpedoes slid up "Arend"/"Eagle" Beach and did not explode. On 17 February, four Dutch Marines were killed when it detonated while they were dismantling it. At least 47 Allied merchant sailors were killed, and several more wounded.

The American Associated Press writer Herbert White was on the island during the attack along with an inspection party under Lieutenant General Frank Andrews. Both men witnessed the attack. The United States military, with the approval of the Dutch government, had just sent a large occupation force to guard the islands and oil refineries from Axis attacks and it now proved to be needed although Aruba was never bombarded again during the war.

== See also ==
- American Theater (World War II)
- Bombardment of Ellwood
