= List of monuments of Aruba =

This table shows an overview of the monuments of Aruba.

Object	Year/architect	Town/section	Address	Coordinates	Number^{?}	Image
Ex Havenkantoor	1940	Oranjestad	A.M. Schuttestraat 2	12.518403°N 70.037536°W	01-001 Info	
Waterreservoir	1905	Oranjestad	Arendstraat(Rancho)	12.521836°N 70.037531°W	01-002 Info	
Landslaboratorium		Oranjestad	Caya Ing R.H. Lacle 2	12.520134°N 70.030208°W	01-003 Info	
Reina Beatrix School	1950	Oranjestad	G.Madurostraat 2	12.514703°N 70.032140°W	01-004 Info	
Maria Convent	1920	Oranjestad	J.E. Irausquinplein 2 A	12.522757°N 70.034730°W	01-005 Info	
Courthouse	1936	Oranjestad	J.G. Emanstraat 51	12.521595°N 70.035701°W	01-006 Info	
Watertower Oranjestad	1939	Oranjestad	J.G. Emanstraat 67	12.521118°N 70.033904°W	01-007 Info	
2nd DOW Office	1939	Oranjestad	Lagoenweg 11	12.517217°N 70.034454°W	01-008 Info	
Government Offices	1942	Oranjestad	L.G. Smith Boulevard 76	12.518452°N 70.037230°W	01-009 Info	
De Arend Petroleum Company	1927	Oranjestad	L.G. Smith Boulevard 172	12.533681°N 70.053361°W	01-010 Info	
Fort Zoutman/Willem III Toren	1866	Oranjestad	Oranjestraat/Zoutmanstraat	12.517803°N 70.035627°W	01-011 Info	
Ex Dow Office	1949	Oranjestad	Paardenbaaistraat 2	12.521610°N 70.041659°W	01-012 Info	
Lime Kiln	1892	Oranjestad	Ranchostraat	12.521537°N 70.037925°W	01-013 Info	
Wild House	1850	Oranjestad	Schelpstraat 12	12.520948°N 70.037887°W	01-014 Info	
Henriquez Building		Oranjestad	Schelpstraat 36/38	12.520830°N 70.037936°W	01-015 Info	
Archaeological Museum	1850	Oranjestad	Schelpstraat 40,42,44	12.520948°N 70.038196°W	01-016 Info	
John F Kennedy school	1950	Oranjestad	Stadionweg 37/ L.G.Smith Blvd	12.509285°N 70.026627°W	01-017 Info	
Yellow House	1860	Oranjestad	Weststraat 15	12.520956°N 70.039859°W	01-018 Info	
School 1888 (ARA building)	1888	Oranjestad	Wilhelminastraat 6	12.518785°N 70.036246°W	01-019 Info	
City Hall	1925	Oranjestad	Wilhelminastraat 8	12.518790°N 70.035900°W	01-020 Info	
Ex Police Station Oranjestad	1940	Oranjestad	Wilhelminastraat 40	12.518408°N 70.034076°W	01-021 Info	
Ex landskantoor	1910	Oranjestad	Zoutmanstraat 1	12.519110°N 70.036901°W	01-022 Info	
Censo / Ex Hotel Colombia	1918	Oranjestad	Zoutmanstraat 13	12.518790°N 70.035900°W	01-023 Info	
Princess Wilhelmina Statue	1955	Oranjestad	Wilhelmina Park	12.518408°N 70.034076°W	01-024 Info	
Ex Botica Aruba	1925	Oranjestad	Steenweg 19	12.518408°N 70.034076°W	01-025 Info	
Commanders Graves		Noord	Hato	12.538985°N 70.036195°W	02-001 Info	
California Lighthouse	1914	Noord	Hudishibana	12.613369°N 70.052415°W	02-002 Info	
Imeldahof		Noord	Noord 2	12.560697°N 70.030980°W	02-003 Info	
Cas Tan Tin		Noord	Pos Abou 19	12.545560°N 70.048340°W	02-004 Info	
Police Station Savaneta		Savaneta	Savaneta 110	12.451569°N 69.949833°W	03-001 Info	
Graves		Savaneta	Savaneta 254 E	12.449306°N 69.946648°W	03-002 Info	
Uncle Louis Store	1951	San Nicolaas	B.van der Veen Zeppenveldstraat7	12.435545°N 69.910206°W	04-001 Info	
Water Tower San Nicolas	1939	San Nicolaas	Bernardstraat	12.435924°N 69.909112°W	04-002 Info	
Commandopost	1940	San Nicolaas	Weg naar kust batterij	12.438389°N 69.889601°W	04-003 Info	
Community Church Seroe Colorado	1939	San Nicolaas	Seroe Colorado 244	12.419797°N 69.884406°W	04-004 Info	
Nicolaas Store	1939	San Nicolaas	B.van der Veen Zeppenfeldstraat 27	12.435924°N 69.909112°W	04-005 Info	
Balashi Gold Smelter	1939	Santa Cruz	Balashi	12.435924°N 69.909112°W	05-001 Info	
Other monuments, category 2			Upload Aruban ,not protected buildings and houses, you consider important part of our Heritage		00-000 Info	Upload Photo

== Gallery of other monuments, category 2 ==
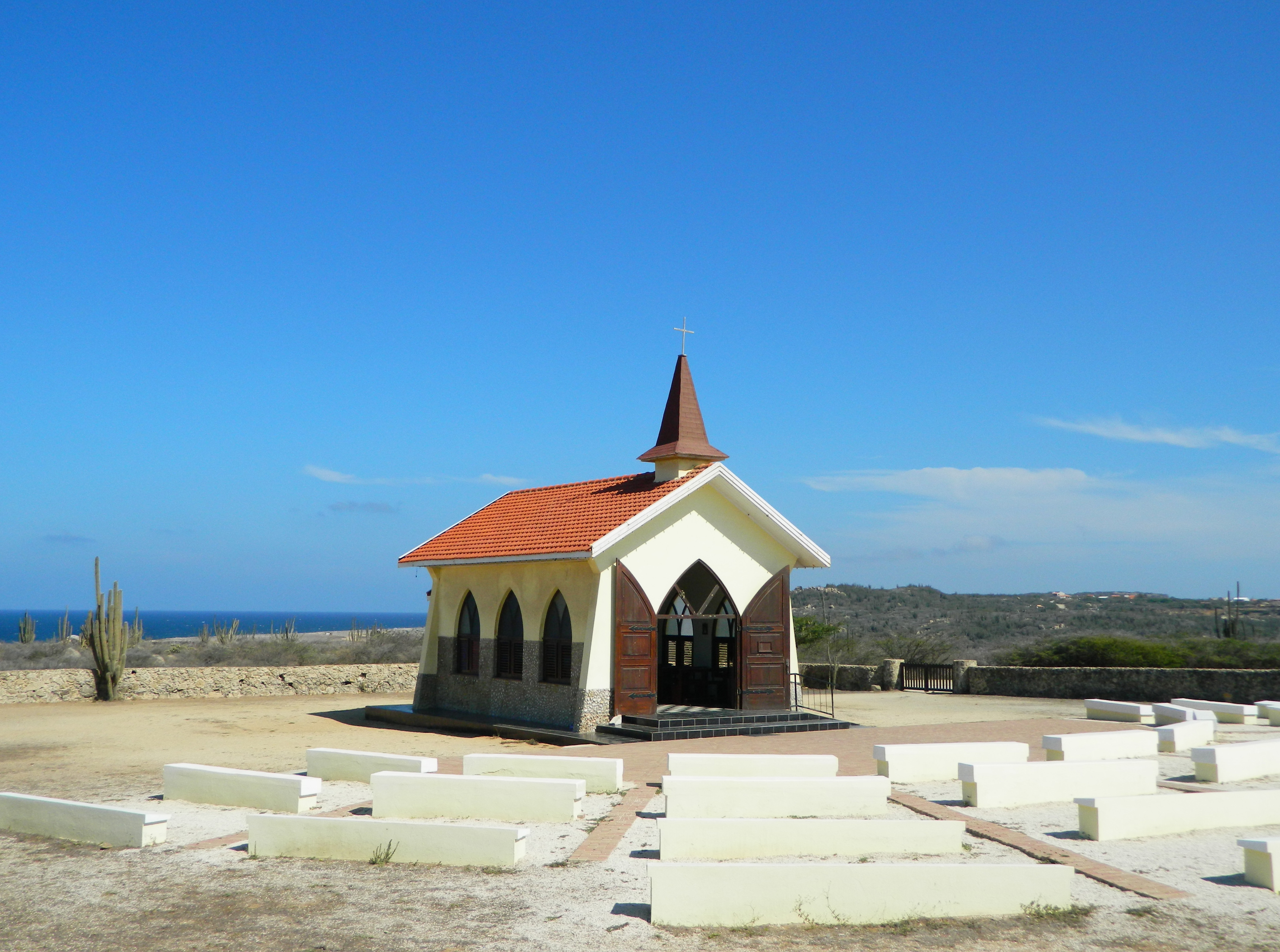

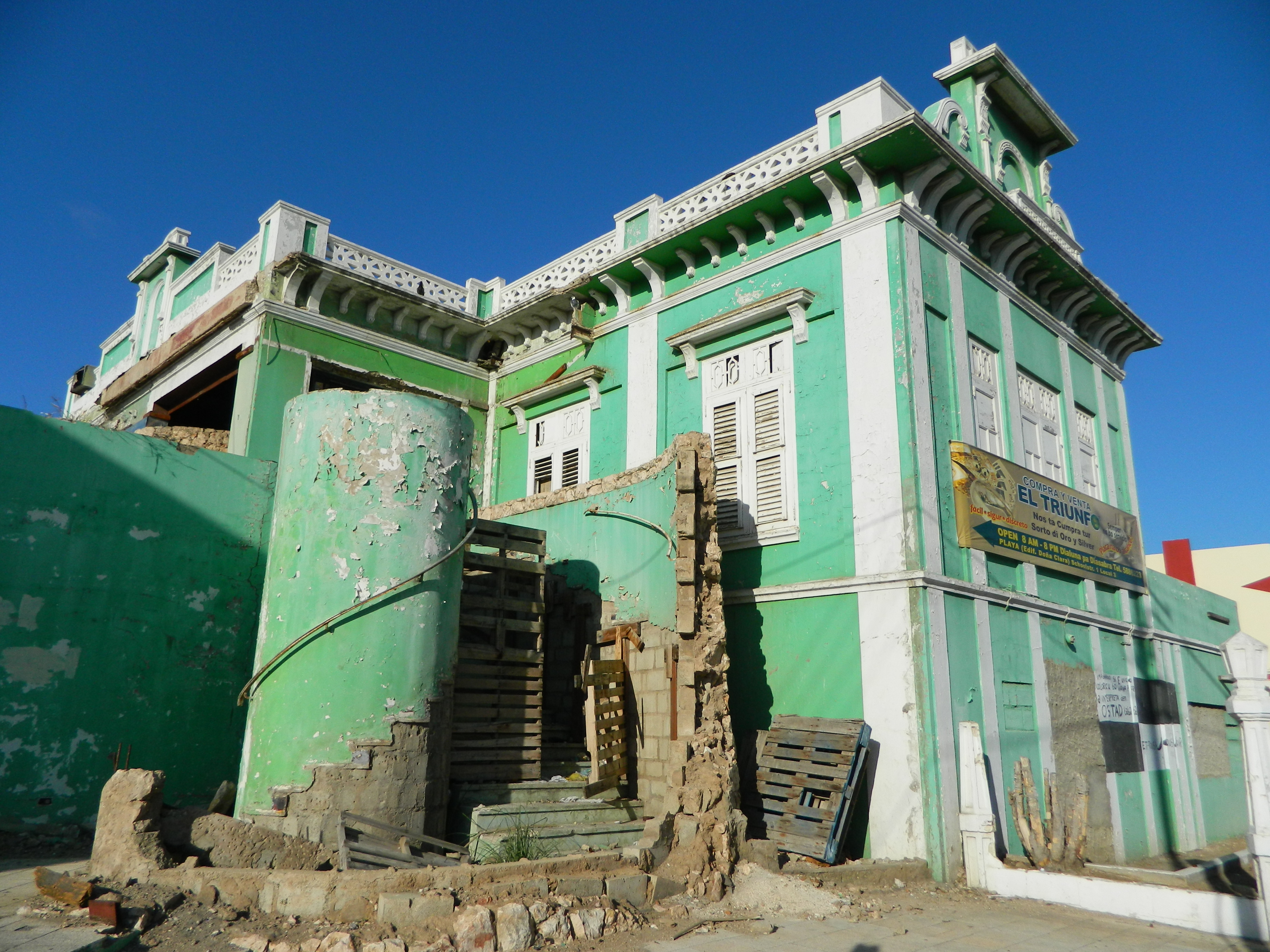

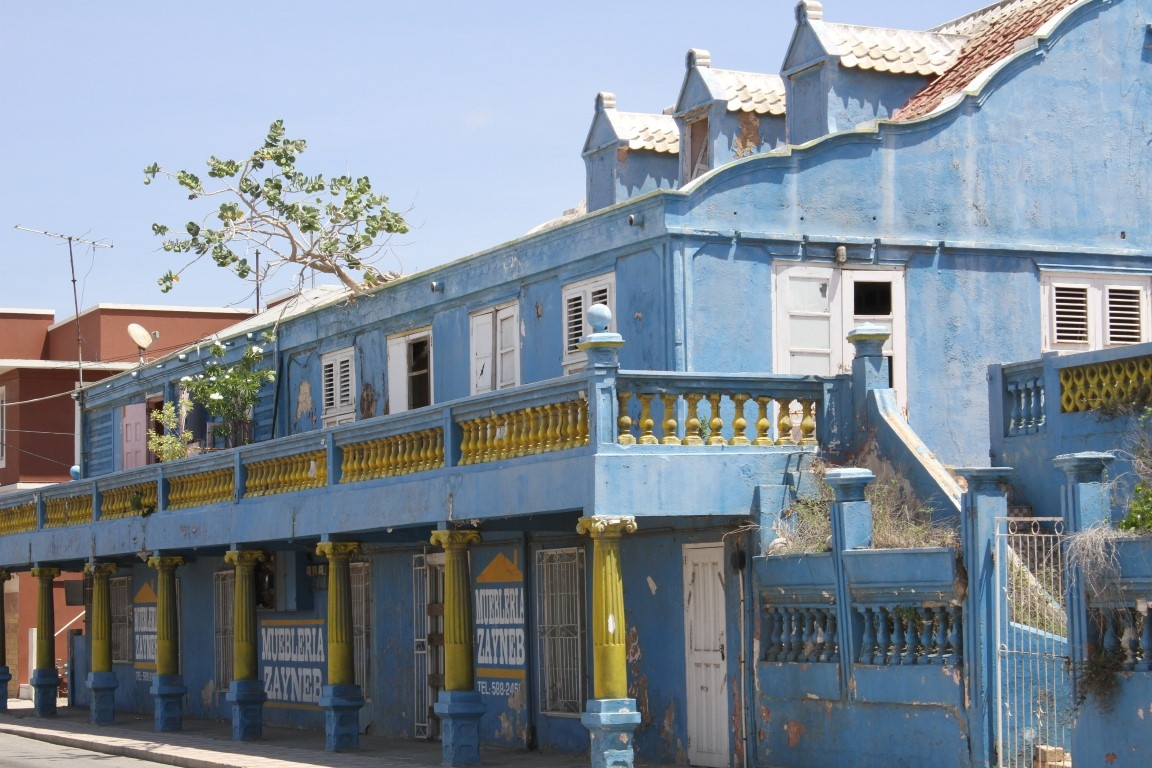

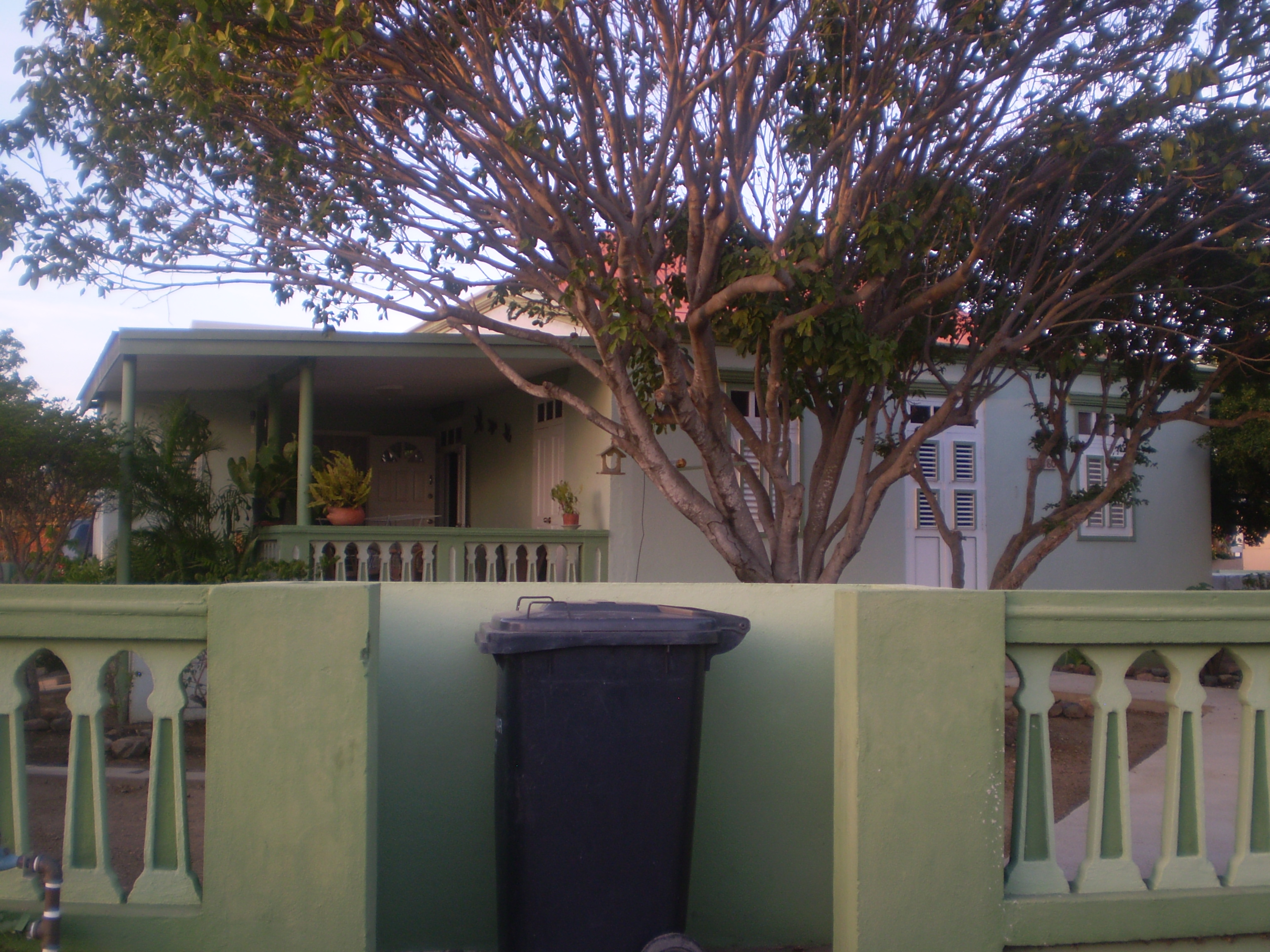

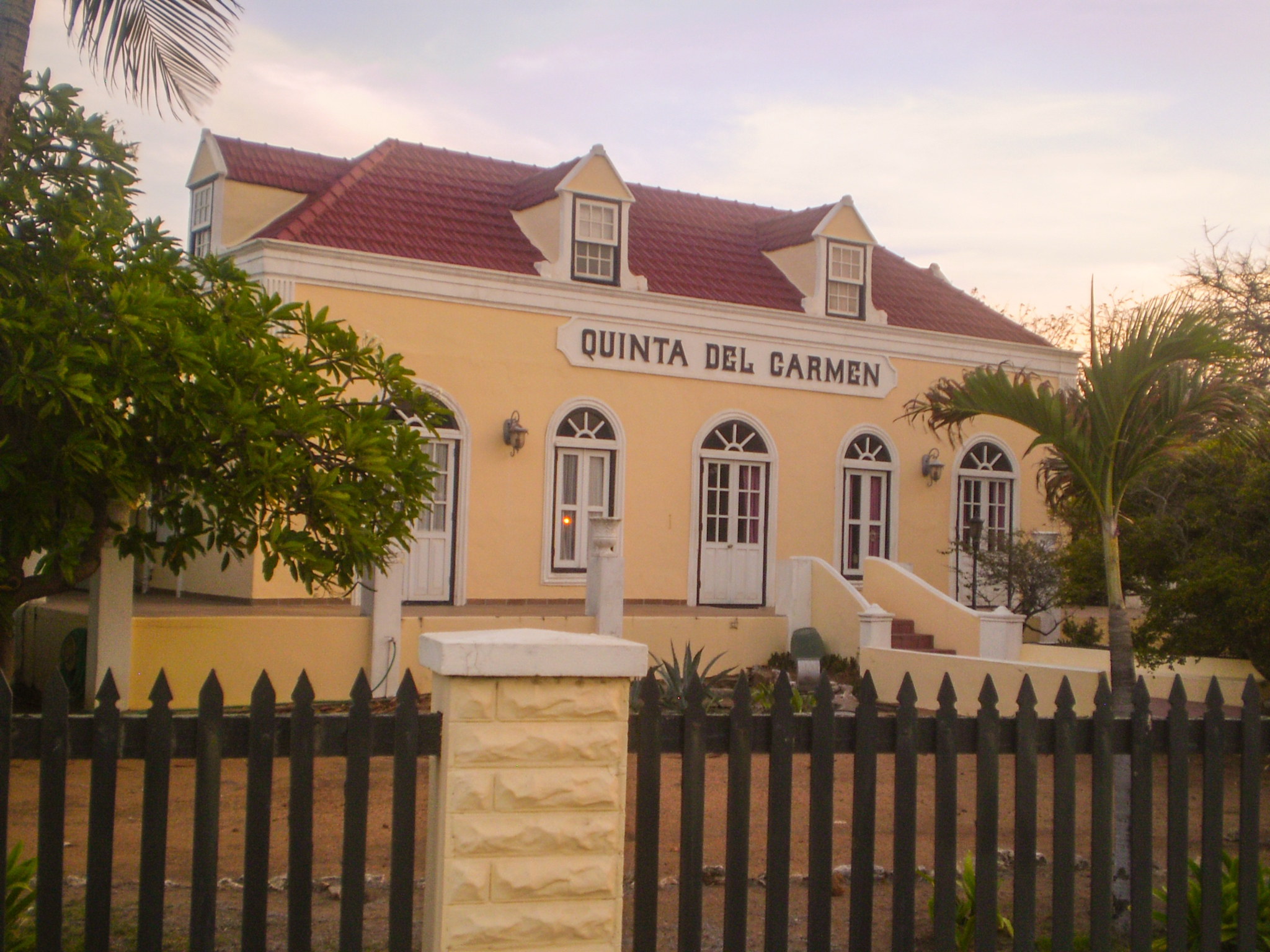

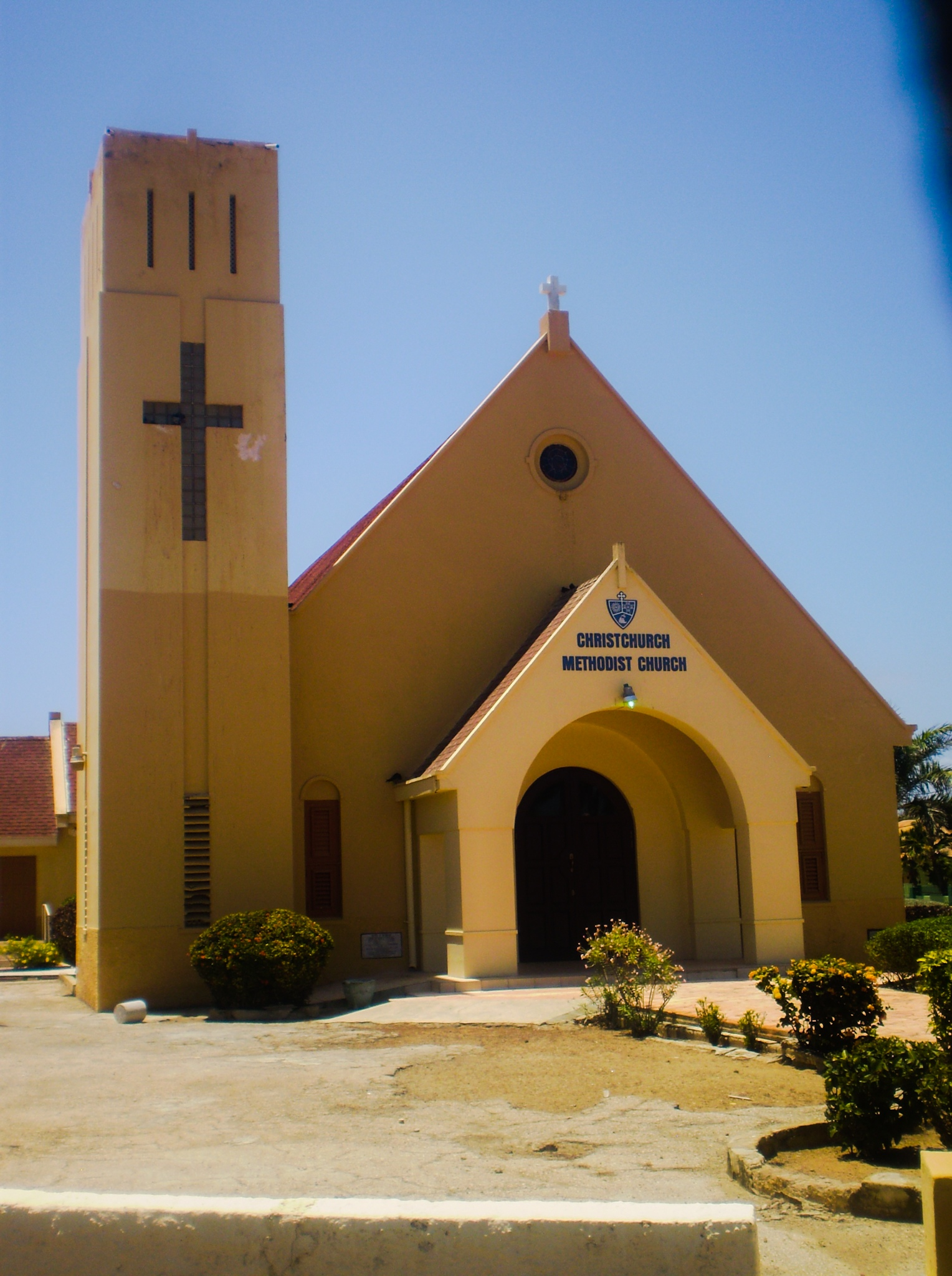

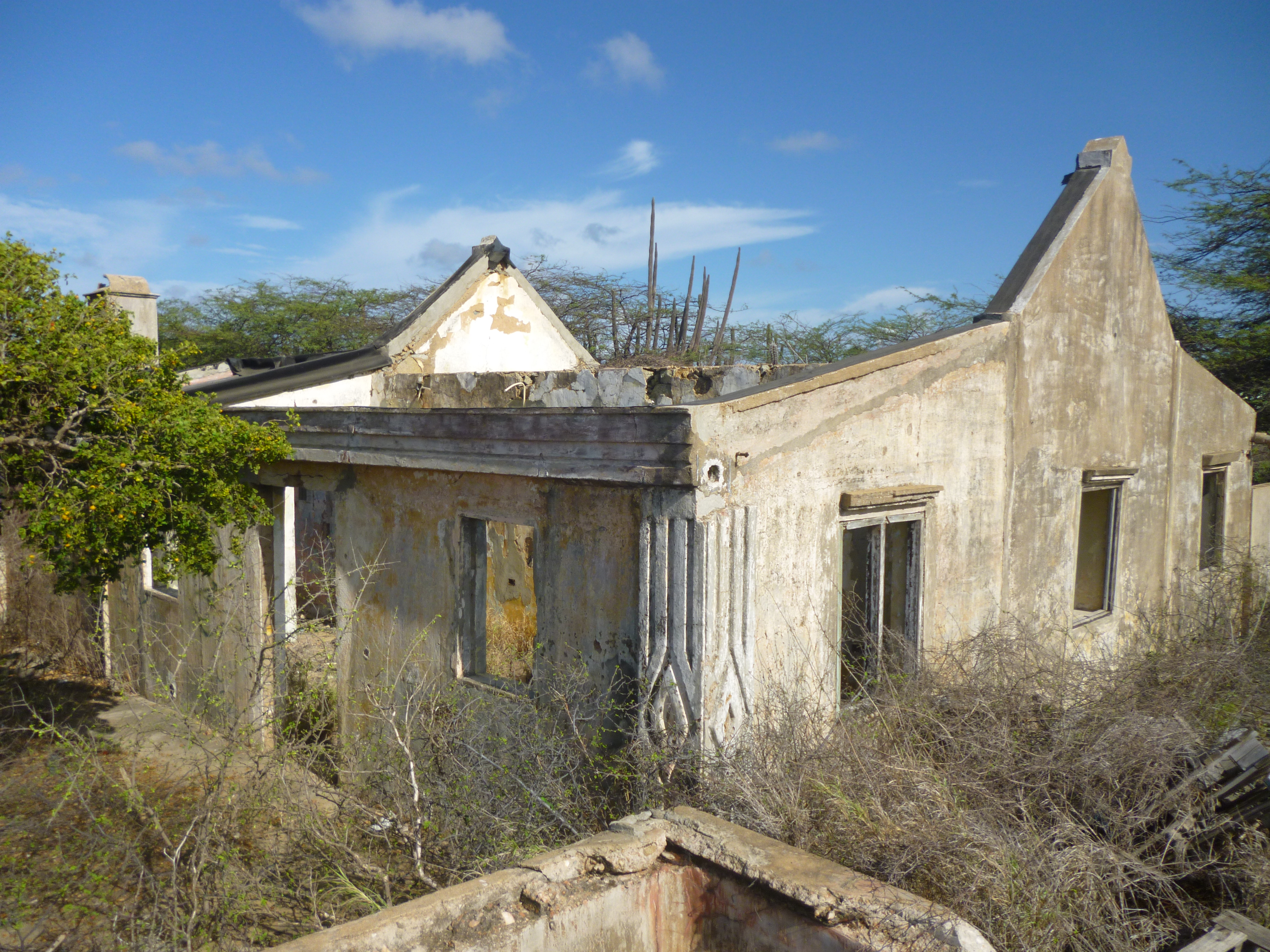

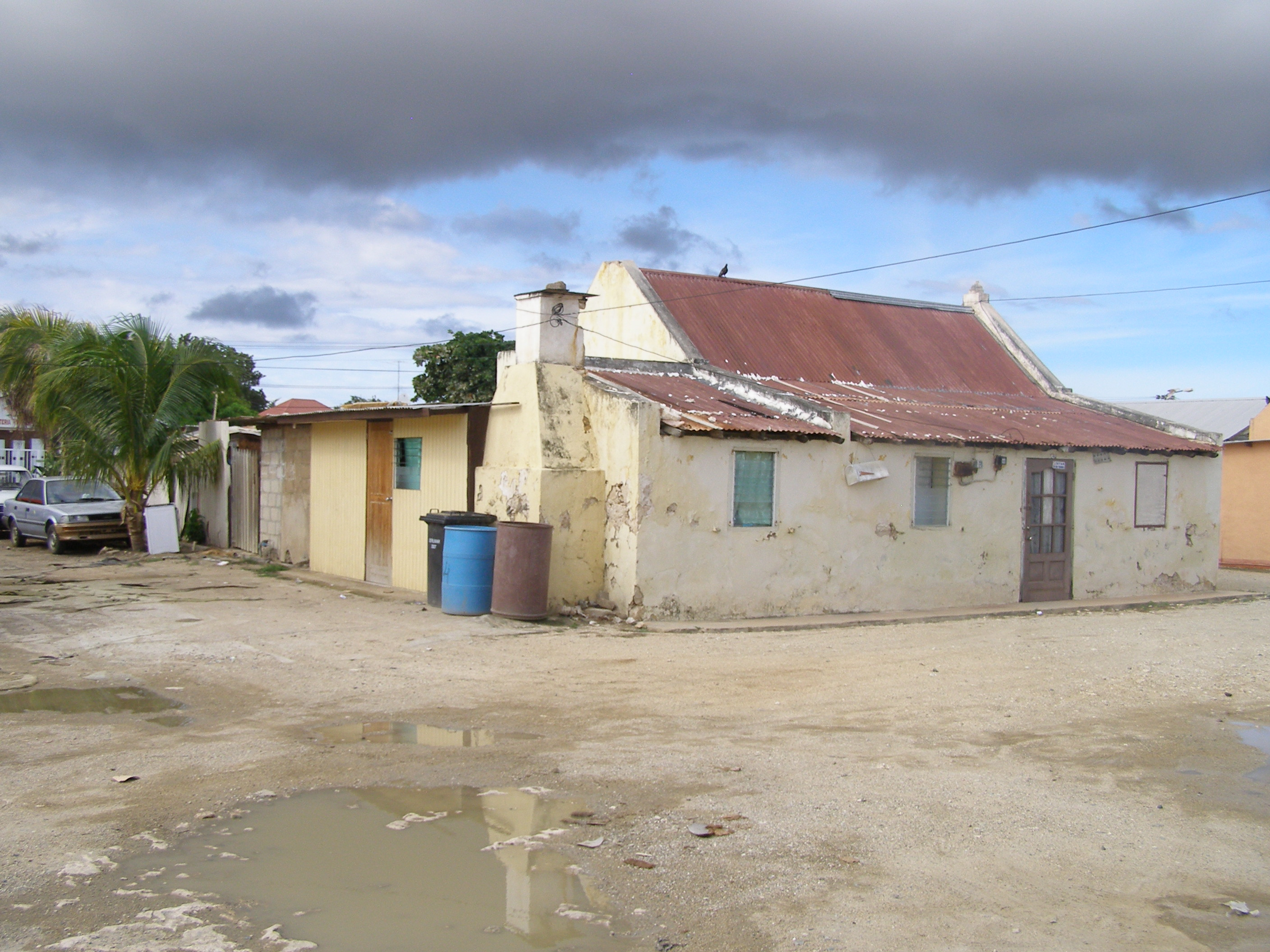

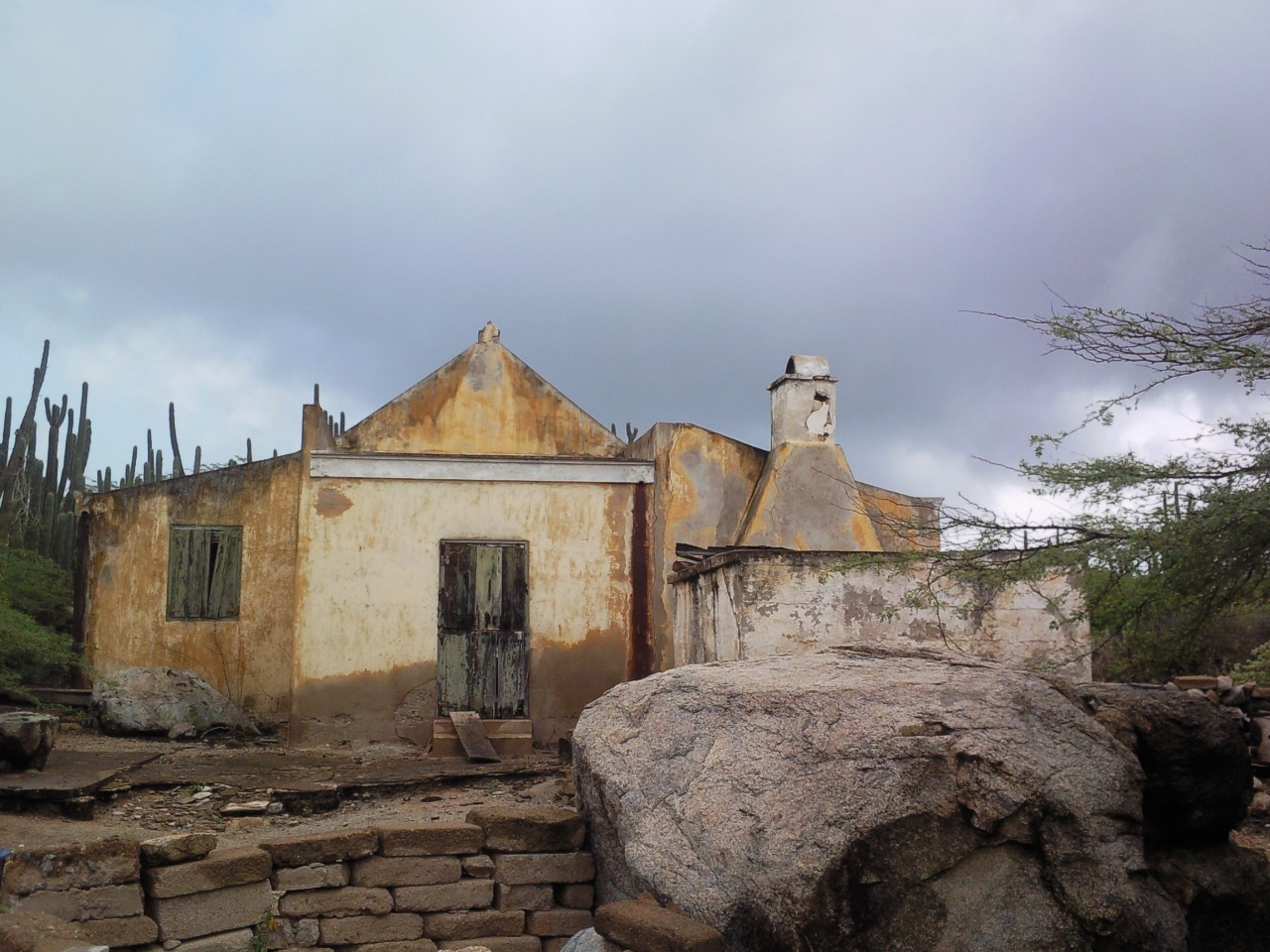
