= Lago Oil and Transport Company =

Oil refinery in Aruba (1924–1985)

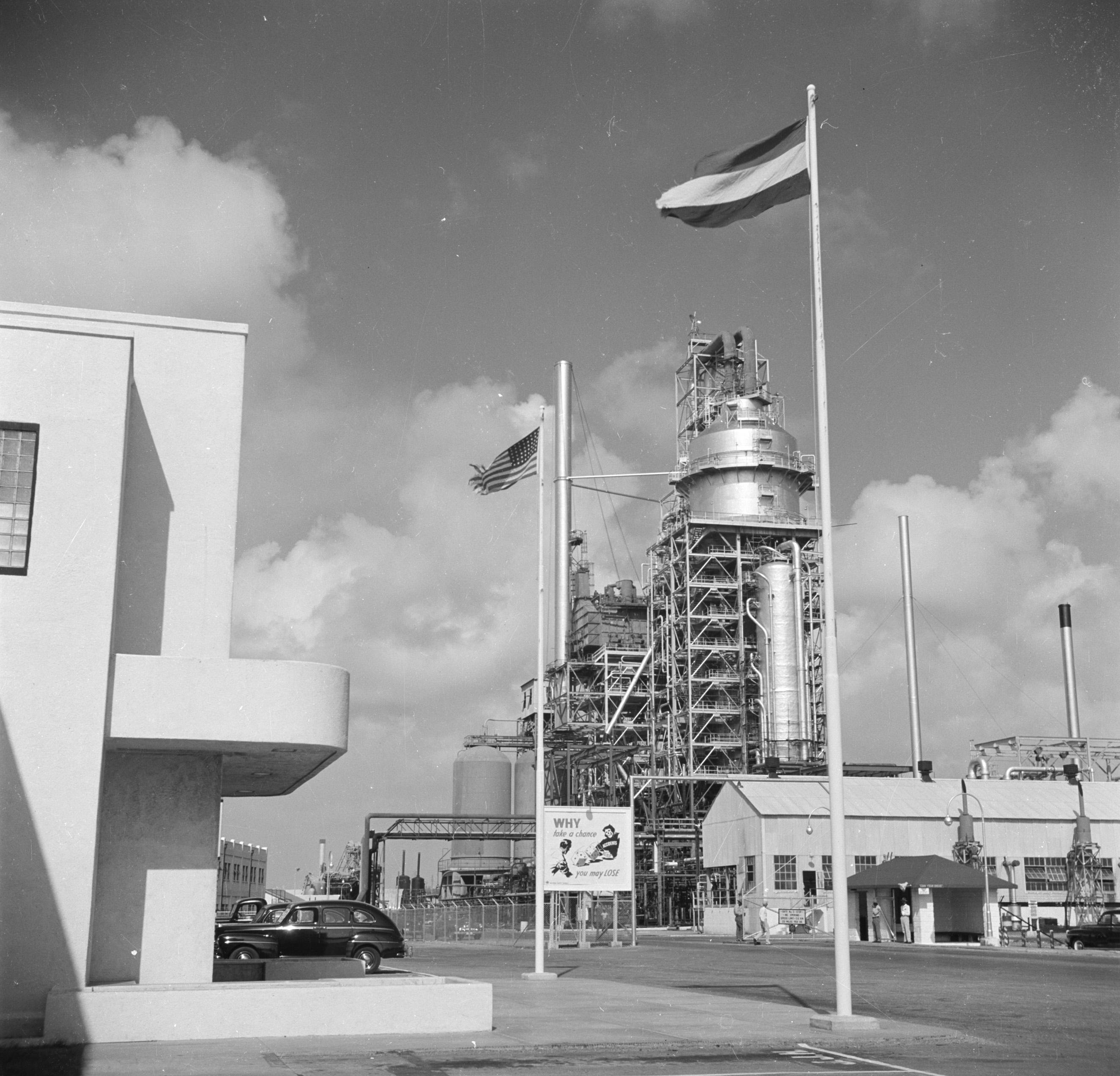
- Location: San Nicolas, Aruba

Refinery details
- Owner: Exxon
- Opened: 1924
- Closed: 1985
- Capacity: 440,000 barrels per day (70,000 m^{3}/d)
- No. of employees: ≈ 10,000 employees (1950–1960)

Lago Oil & Transport Co. Ltd. was established in 1924 as a shipping company responsible for transporting crude oil from Lake Maracaibo to its transshipment facility on the island of Aruba. The Lago refinery, a subsidiary of the Standard Oil Company (Exxon), remained in operation until March 31, 1985, when Exxon made the decision to shut down and dismantle both the refinery and Lago Colony.

== History ==
The discovery of a substantial amount of crude oil beneath Lake Maracaibo presented a transportation challenge; the channel leading to the lake was too shallow for oceangoing oil tankers. In response to this challenge, the Pan American Petroleum and Transport Company, which held a lease on a significant area of Lake Maracaibo, founded Lago Petroleum Corporation (1923–1932). This corporation's primary purpose was to operate lake tankers responsible for transporting the crude oil from Lake Maracaibo to Aruba.

On August 14, 1924, Captain Robert Rodgers, a Scottish agent representing the Lago Petroleum Company, was in search of a suitable harbor for the transshipment of Lago crude oil from the Maracaibo field. Following surveys of the harbor at San Nicolas, where the wharf and railway of the former Aruba Phosphate Company were located, expansion of the harbor and construction of the oil depot began and was in progress by November 1924.

The location was ideal due to the closeness of the production site, stable political climate, ideal harbor, and available land. Meanwhile, the oil depot was under construction in San Nicolas, transshipment of oil was taking place from tankers anchored off Oranjestad, bound to the United States. In the United States, the crude oil underwent the refining process to produce various petroleum products such as gasoline, diesel fuel, Bunker C, and heating oil.

On February 24, 1928, construction commenced on the refinery. The initial focus was on providing housing for foreign American workers and their families as the first priority.

=== Refinery ===
In 1928, Standard Oil of Indiana purchased the Lago transshipment Pan American Petroleum facility in Aruba, as well as the oil holdings under Lake Maracaibo in Venezuela. Standard Oil of Indiana then began to build a small refinery next to the transshipping facility port. Soon after the small refinery had been completed, a tax was anticipated to be imposed by the U S Government on imported crude. Standard of Indiana had only marketing outlets in the United States and knew they could not compete when selling imported oil that had been burdened with a toll, so they sold all their holdings to Standard Oil of New Jersey, who had marketing outlets around the world. Standard Oil of New Jersey purchased not only the small refinery in Aruba, but also the vast holding in crude oil Standard of Indiana owned under Lake Maracaibo.

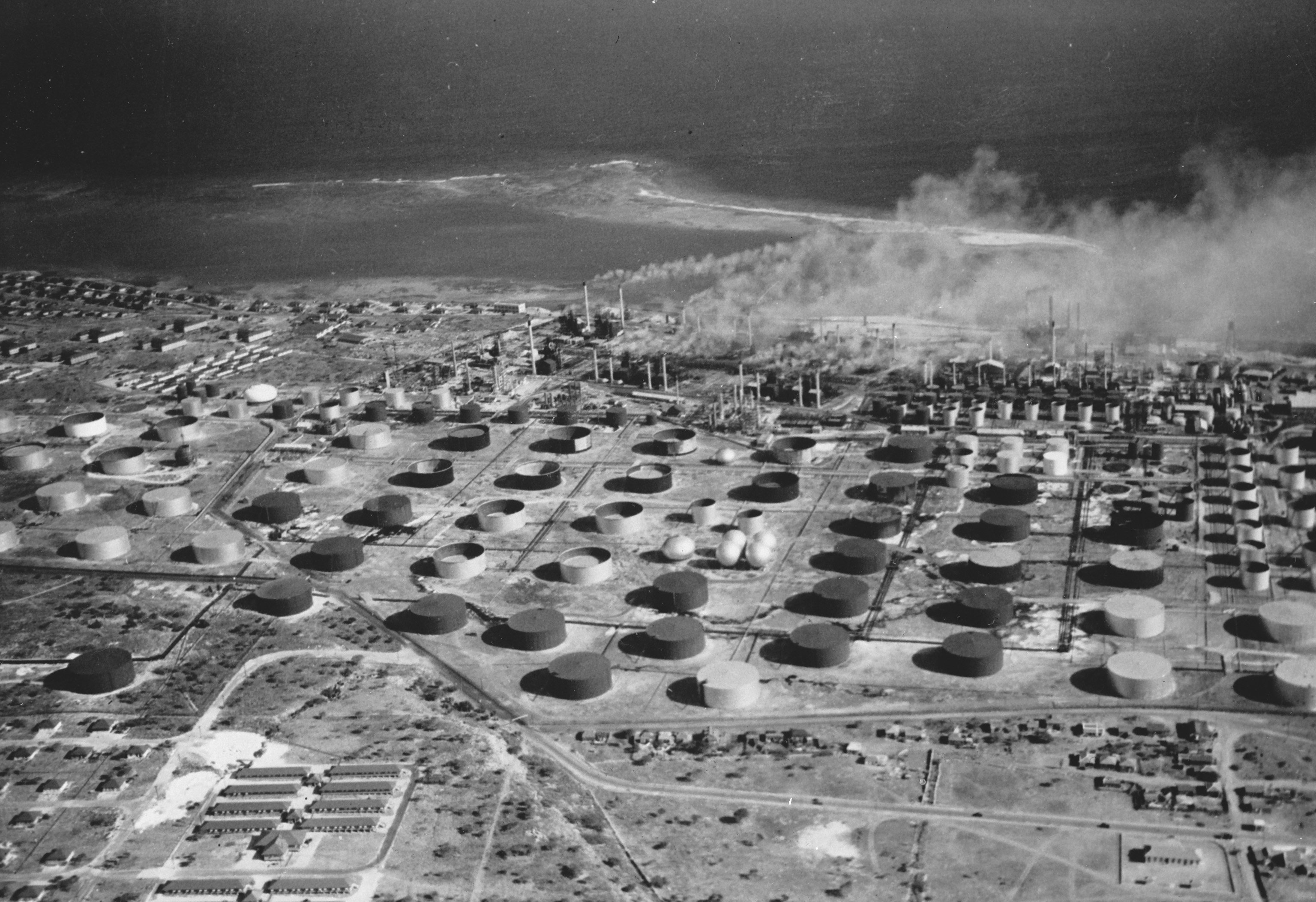
Aerial view of oil depot (c. 1940–1945)

In 1938, Standard Oil of New Jersey obtained a contract to supply Britain with 100 octane aviation gasoline. However, because of the isolationism that was prevalent in the United States (and which indeed resulted in the US staying neutral in WWII, until the end of 1941), the contract stated that the product had to be produced outside the United States. Because Aruba was under Dutch control, the Lago refinery became an important asset by providing a place outside the United States where aviation gasoline could be produced without legal and international problems. Thus, the size of that refinery expanded long before the United States entered World War II.

=== Wartime ===
With the United States entry into World War II in 1942, the demand for Aviation gasoline further increased and considerable expansion was done at the Lago Refinery soon after that. With this expansion, Lago became one of the largest refineries in the world, only bested by Royal Dutch Shell refinery on Dutch-owned Curaçao, and a major producer of petroleum products for the Allied war efforts.

The importance of the Lago refinery was well known to the German High Command and an Attack on Aruba was performed. On February 16, 1942, the site was attacked by the German submarine U-156. The submarine's deck gun exploded due to mistakes by the German deck gunner, and the refinery was not damaged. However, three of the lake tankers that carried crude oil from Lago Maracaibo were torpedoed.

=== Postwar ===
When demand for gasoline was high after World War II, the Lago Refinery was running at full capacity and employed over 10,000 personnel. About a thousand were foreign staff employees in supervisory positions and the remainder of the work force was from the native population of Aruba as well as "off-islanders", imported from mainly the British West Indies. These employees lived in San Nicolaas and in the interior of the island, the foreign staff employees lived in a "company town" known as Lago Colony, which was east of the refinery.

In 1985, Exxon Corporation closed the Lago Refinery and began to dismantle the facility as well as the colony. Before the refinery was partially dismantled, it was taken over by the Aruba Government and sold to Coastal Corporation, which re-opened the refinery after a major overhaul but not nearly at its original capacity. Coastal later sold the refinery to Valero Energy Corporation. Late 2017, Citgo Petroleum Corporation took over the refinery.

== See also ==
- Lago Colony
- Arend Petroleum Company

== Sources ==
- Dew, Lee A. (1977). "The Railroad at Lago" (PDF). Railverkeer op Aruba en Curaçao [The railroads of Aruba and Curaçao]. pp. 27–46. ISBN 978-9060075784.
- Zwan, J. van der; Merryweather, S. (1948). "N.V. Arend Petroleum Maatschappij" [Arend Petroleum Company Ltd.]. Oranje en de zes Caraibische parelen : officieel gedenkboek ter gelegenheid van het gouden regeringsjubileum van hare majesteit Koningin Wilhelmina Helena [Orange and the Six Caribbean Pearls: Official Commemorative Book on the Occasion of the Golden Reign Jubilee of Her Majesty Queen Wilhelmina Helena.] (in Dutch). Amsterdam: De Bussy. pp. 445–448. OCLC 906322310.
