= Druif Beach =

Beach in Aruba

- Beach
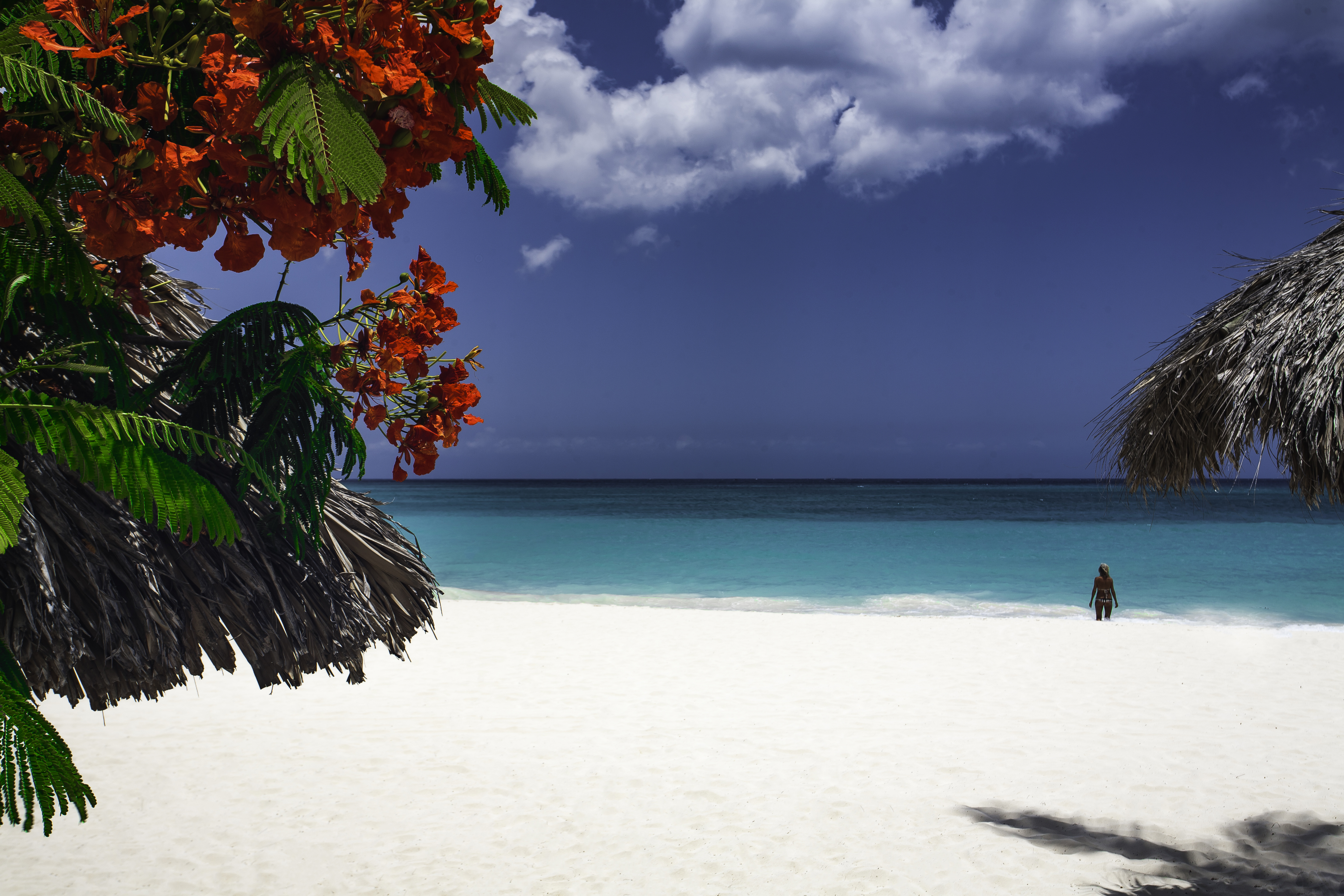
- Interactive map of Druif Beach
- Coordinates: 12°31′55.20″N 70°3′25.20″W
- Location: Oranjestad, Aruba

Druif Beach, is situated in Oranjestad, Aruba and spans approximately 300 metres (980 ft) in length.
