= Eagle Beach =

Beach in Aruba

Eagle Beach Arend Beach
- Beach and village
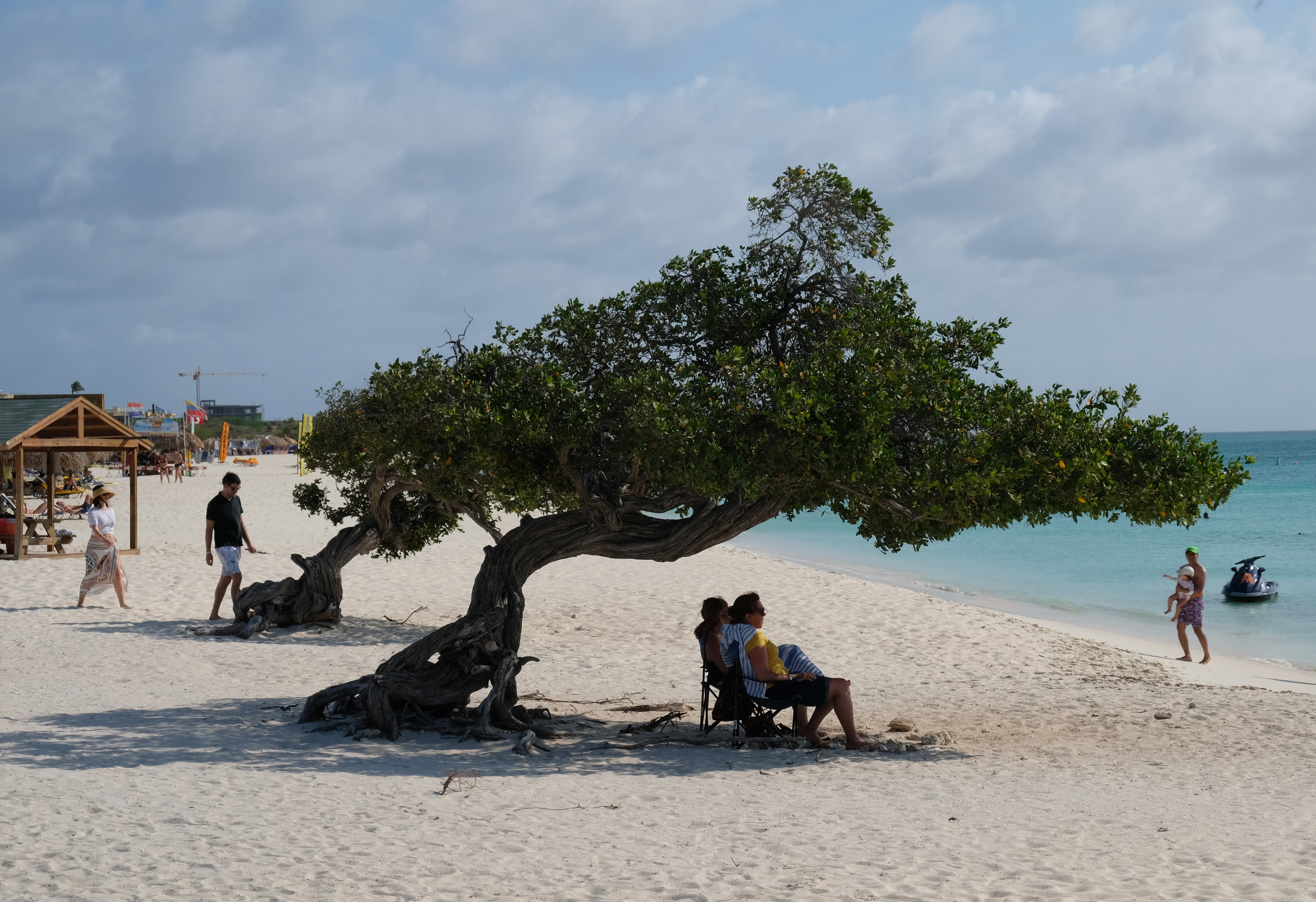

- Location in Aruba
- Coordinates: 12.5492°N 70.0579°W
- Country: Aruba
- Region: Oranjestad West

Government

Population (2010)
  - Total: 431

Eagle Beach (or Arend Beach) is a beach and neighbourhood of Oranjestad, Aruba. The neighbourhood is famous for its many low-rise resorts and wide public beach. It is the widest beach of Aruba. and has soft white sand. It has been rated one of the best beaches in the world.
