= Culture of Aruba =

The culture of Aruba, encompassing its language, music, and cuisine, is diverse and has been influenced by both regional and foreign cultures. One significant foreign influence originates from the Iberian Peninsula, which had a significant impact on the island for approximately 137 years, starting c. 1500. These influences were characterized by a strong religious presence, missionary activities, and economic exploitation.

Since 1636, during the Eighty Years' War (1621–1648), the Dutch played a crucial role in shaping Aruba's identity, driven by their exploratory and mercantile spirit, contributing to the island's modern character.

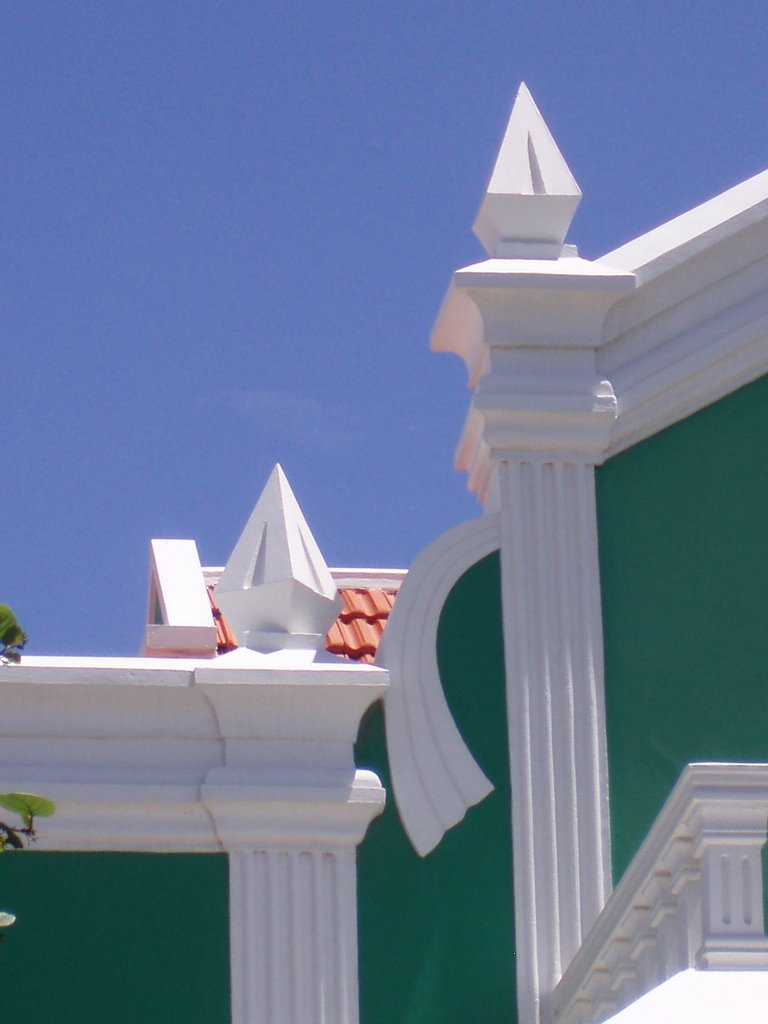
Ornaments on City Hall

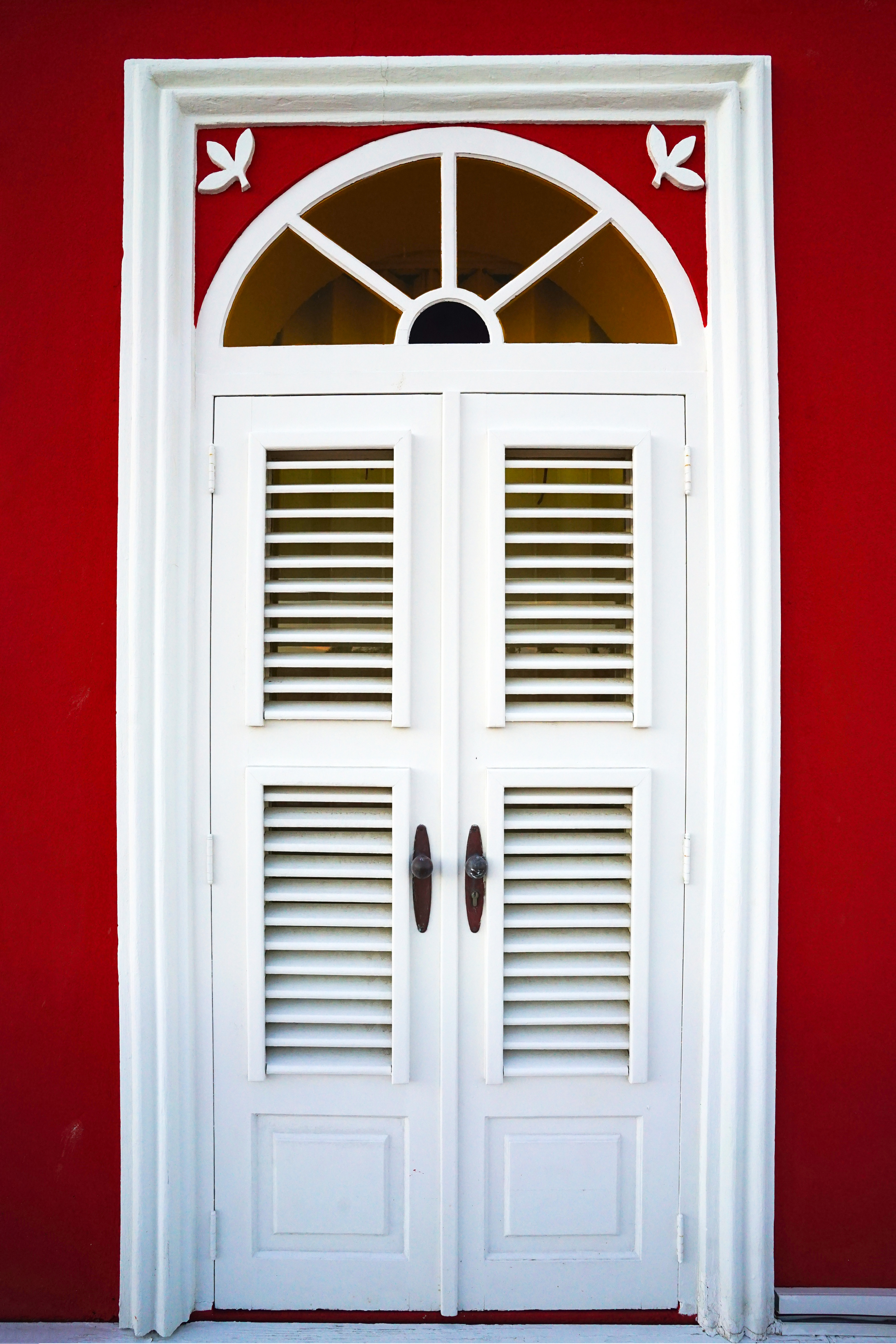
Door of former Hotel Colombia

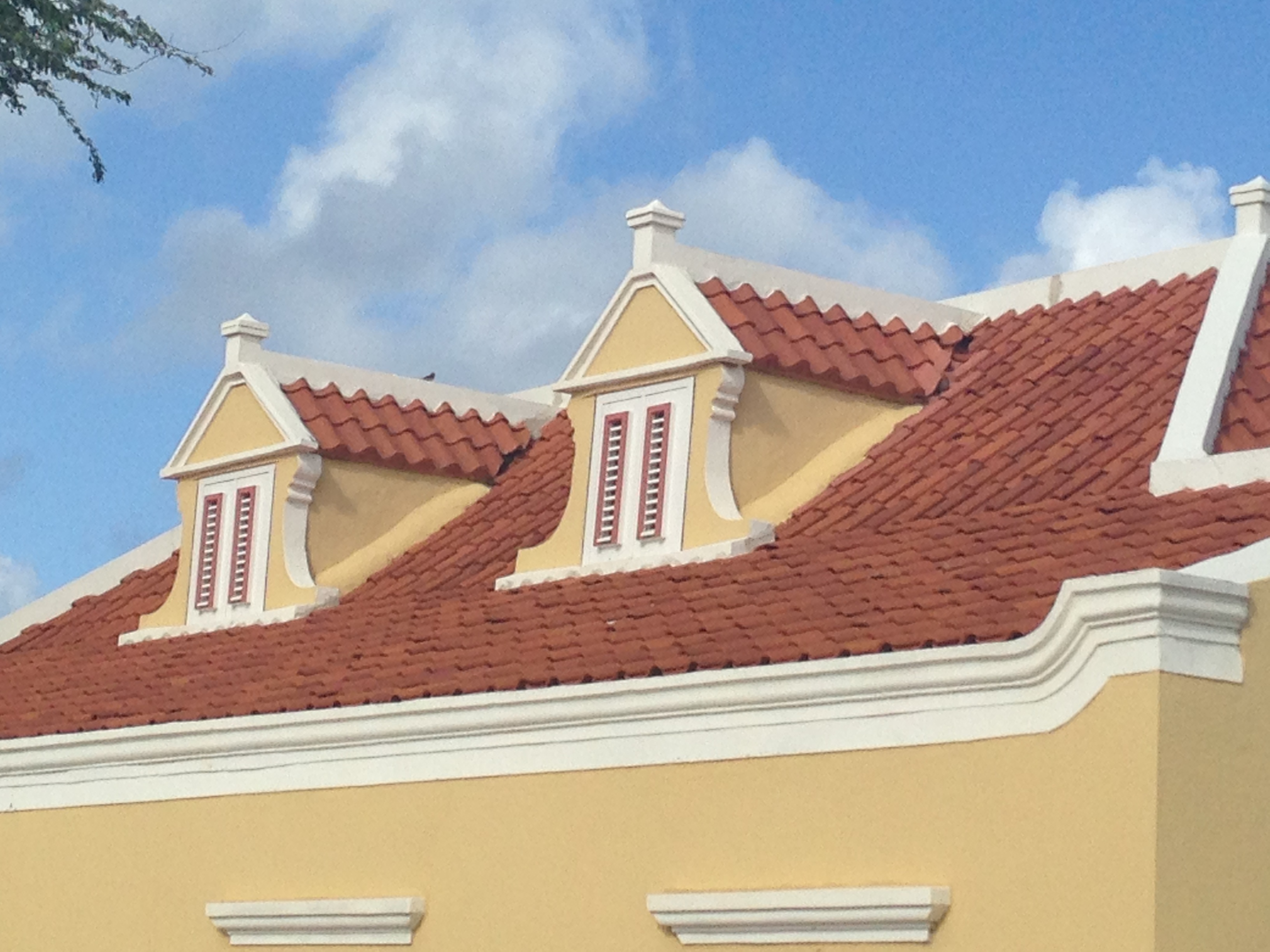
Dormer on yellow house in Weststraat 15

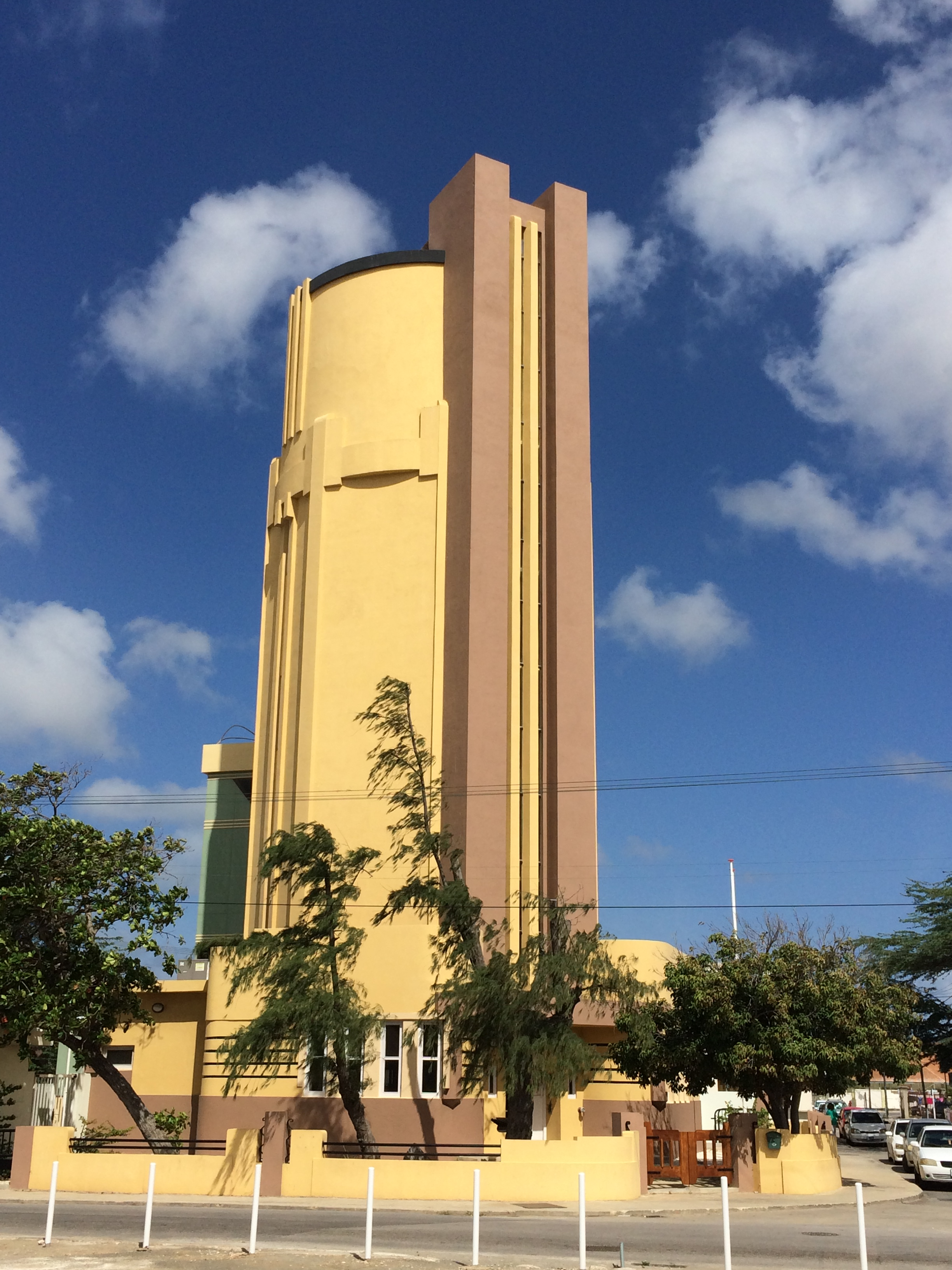
Art deco influences with the establishment of the oil industry (Lago Oil and Transport Company).

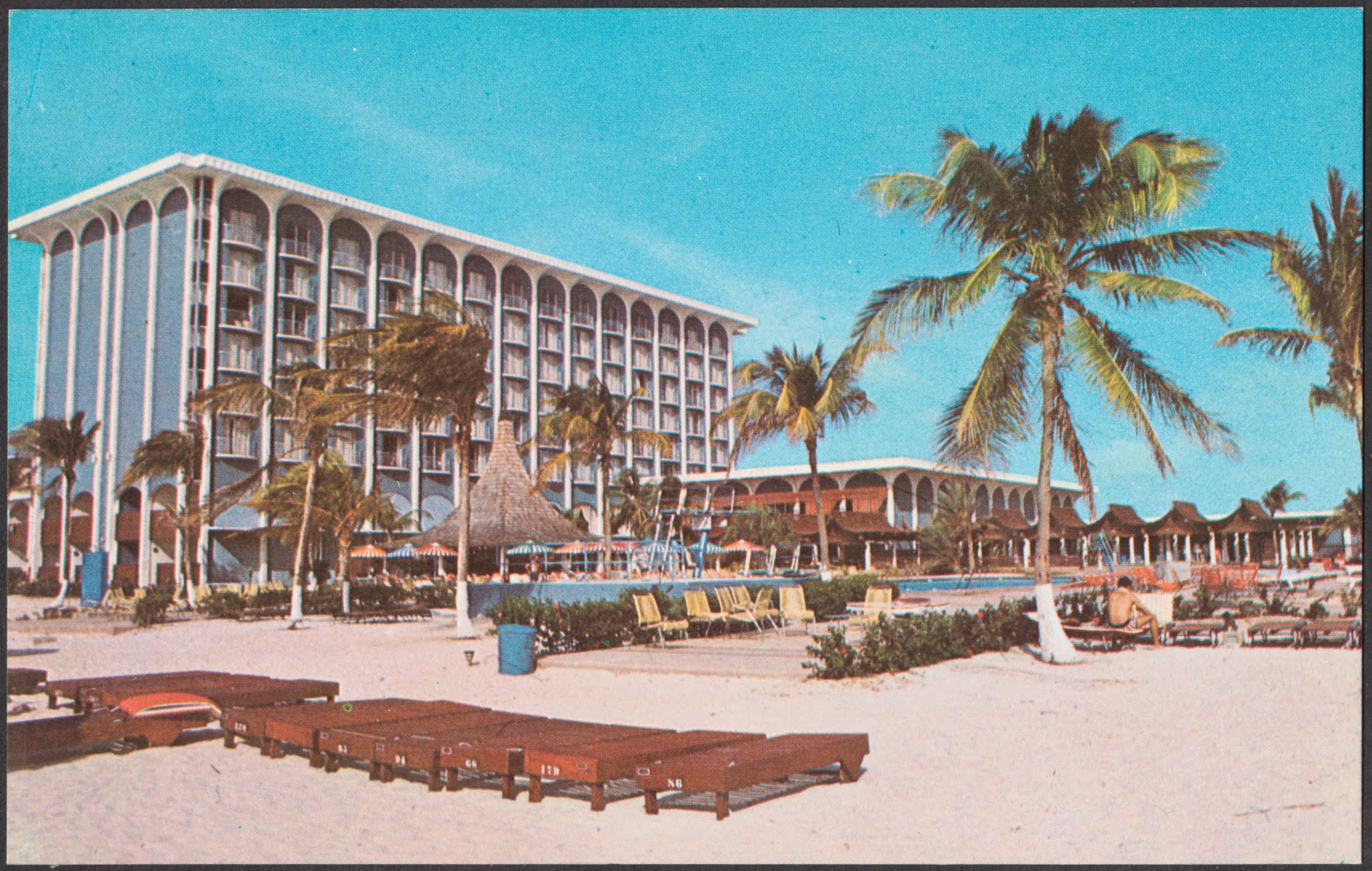
Former Sheraton Hotel (1960–1979) beside Aruba's largest hotel, formerly Concord (1977), now RIU Hotel (2007).

The Aruban tourism industry dates to the 1930s, when the first commercial airline landed on Aruba and a guest house was established in Oranjestad. Starting in the early 1950s, with the rise of a new wave in the tourism industry and the opening of the first luxury resort, Aruba Caribbean Hotel, a national aspiration arose to become "The little Miami of the Caribbean". However, this focus on developing a small island tourism economy (SITES or SIDS) led to rapid and uncontrolled expansion of the tourism sector. As consequence, it brought about a range of socio-ecological challenges and disrupted the sociocultural fabric of the island, known internationally as "One Happy Island".

== Cuisine ==
Aruba being located in the Leeward Antilles just off the coast of Venezuela, is among the driest islands in the Caribbean, mostly due to the rain shadow effect on its climate and its location outside the path of tropical storms and hurricanes. Due to its advantageous proximity to Venezuela, the island received supplies of fruit and vegetables. Presently, Aruba imports tropical fruits from United States of America, Colombia, Costa Rica, Dominican Republic, and the Netherlands.

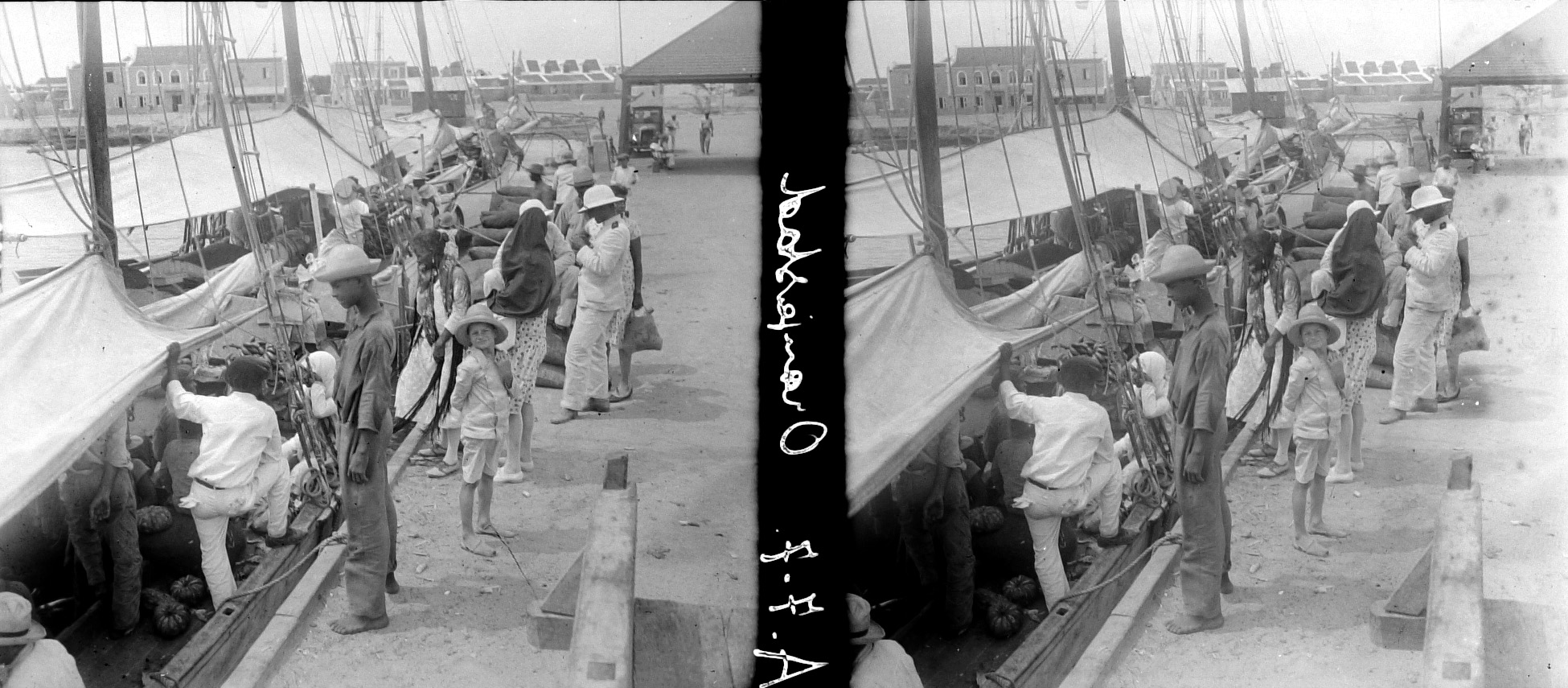
Pier in Oranjestad with barges that arrived loaded with fruit from Venezuela (1930)

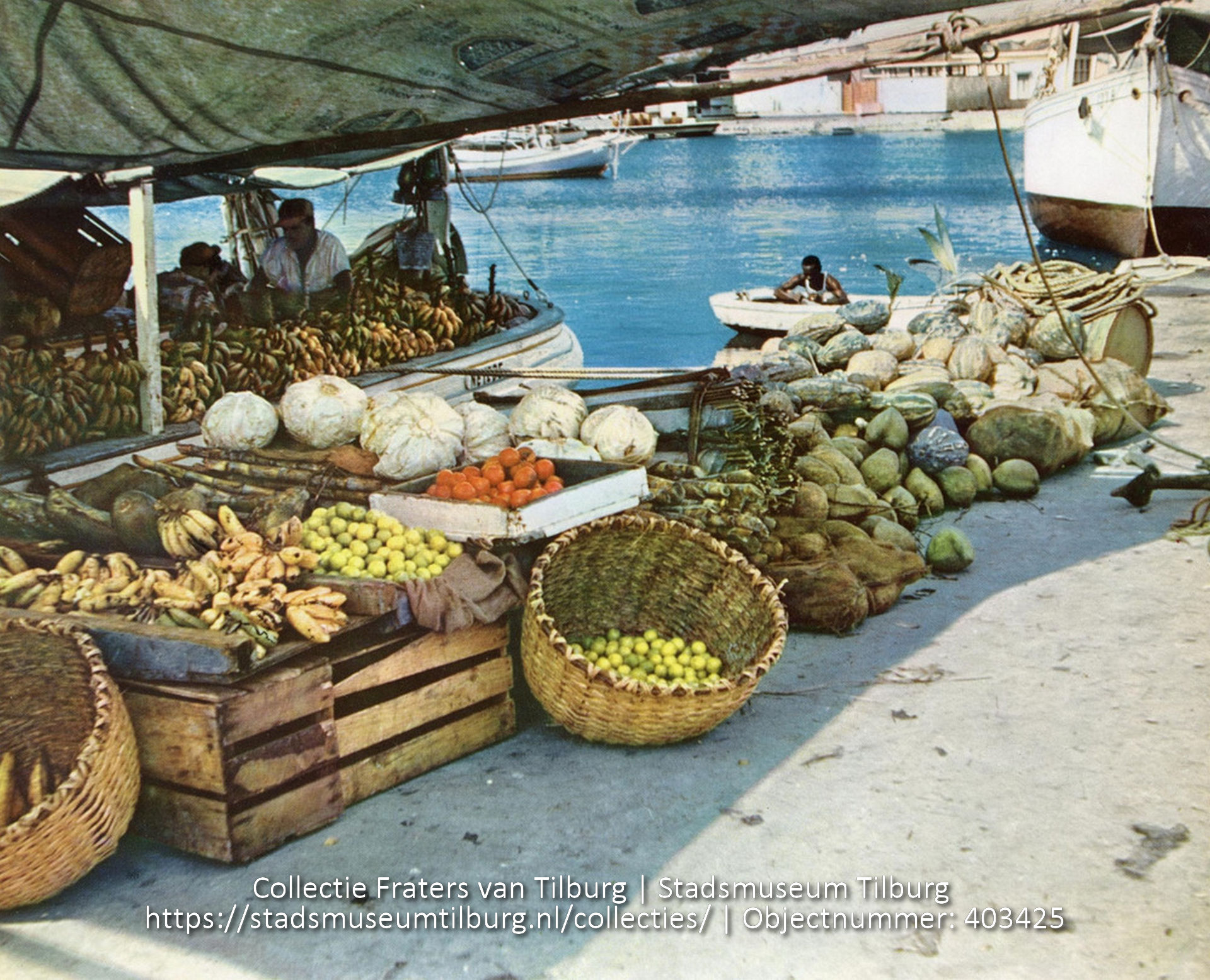
Fruit and vegetable market at Paardenbaai harbor in Aruba (n.d.)

=== Cuisine history ===
Aruban cuisine shares similarities with dishes from other Caribbean islands and Venezuela, but it also possesses its own distinct character. Over the course of its history, Aruba changed ownership multiple times and was inhabited by diverse races, each contributing to the development of the culture, language, music, and food.

==== Arawak influence ====
The original inhabitants of Aruba, known as the Arawak-speaking Caquetios, sustained themselves through simple farming, fishing, and hunting. They cultivated corn and brown beans together, because beans helped maintain the soil's fertility. They also grew sweet potatoes, groundnuts, cocoa, and cassava. Their sources of protein included turkey, duck, iguanas, and seafood from the nearby waters. Fruits were readily available.

Upon the arrival of the Spaniards in the Caribbean islands, they recognized the value of crops like corn, cocoa, groundnuts, and peppers. They were introduced to new fruits like papaya, avocado, coconut, guava, and pineapple. Herbs like basil and oregano, used by the indigenous people for flavoring, also caught their attention. The Spaniards learned about annatto (a saffron substitute), allspice, and other seasonings. This blend of indigenous and Spanish influences laid the foundation for the diverse Aruban cuisine.

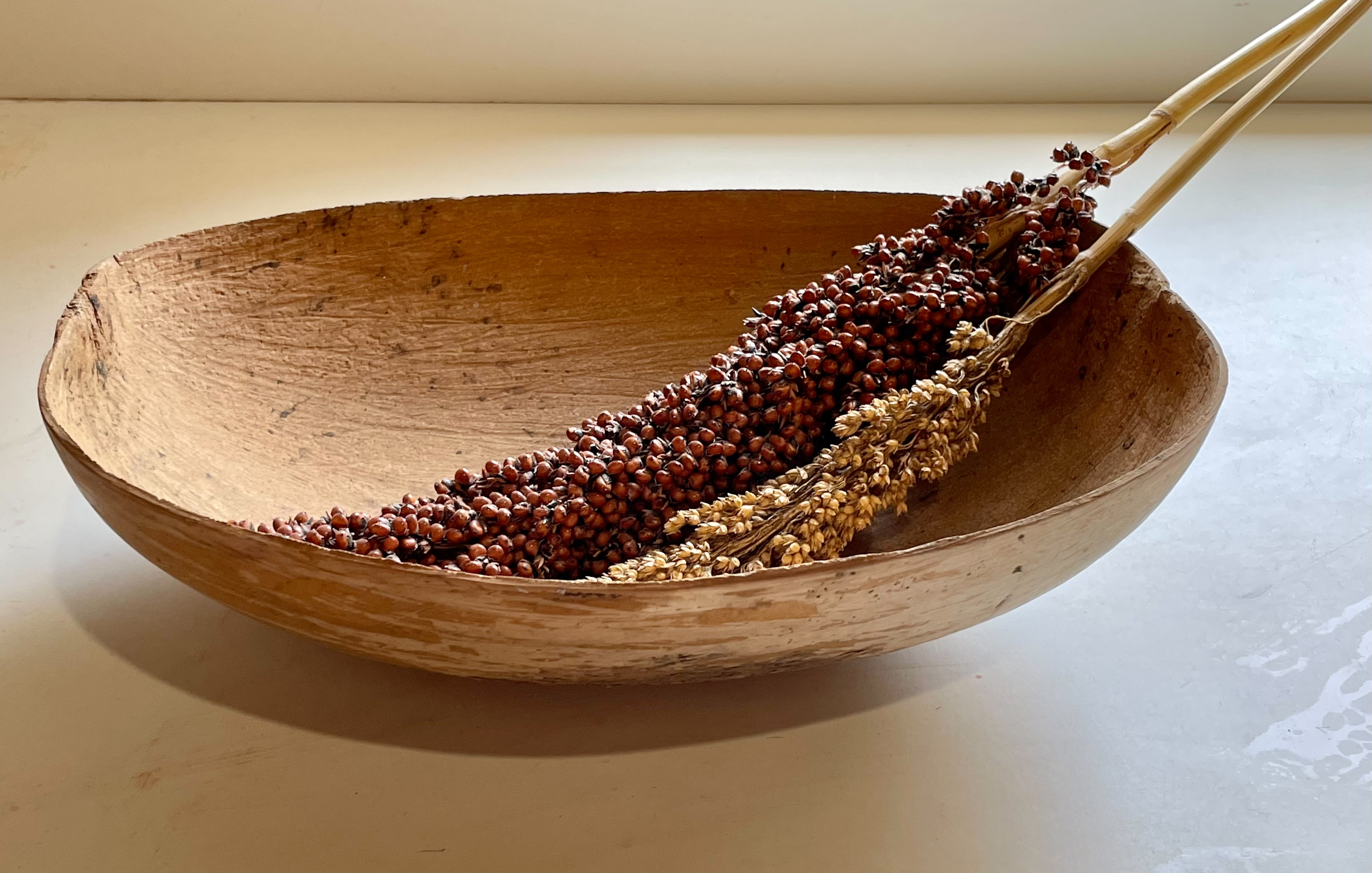
In Aruba maishi rabo (Sorghum bicolor; Spc.introduced) is used to make pan bati (typical Aruban flat native bread). While funchi is made from corn (Zea mais)

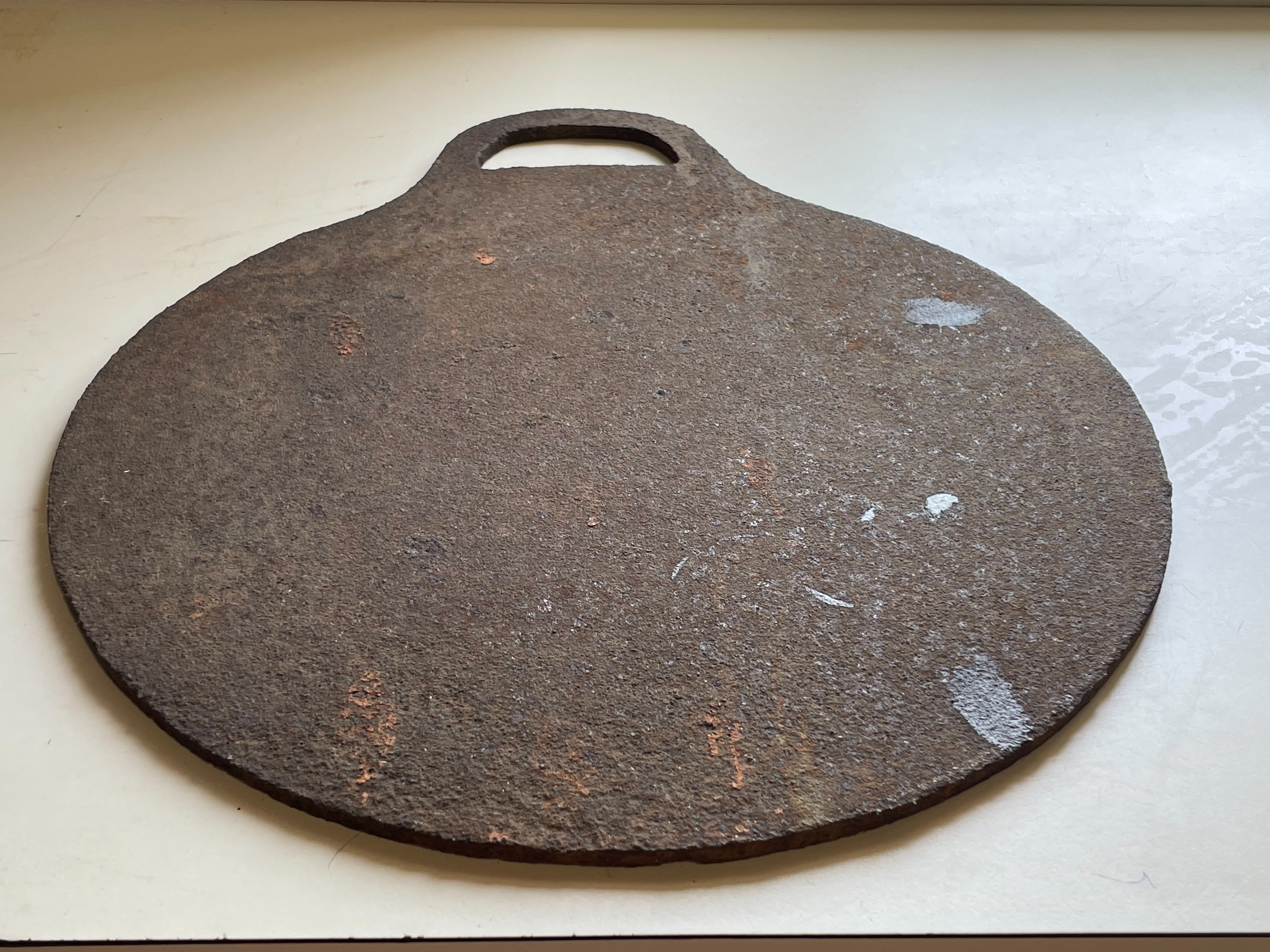
Casuela (flat cast iron griddle) or buren(flat clay griddle) are used to cook arepa, cachapa and pan bati. An equivalent variety is the comal.

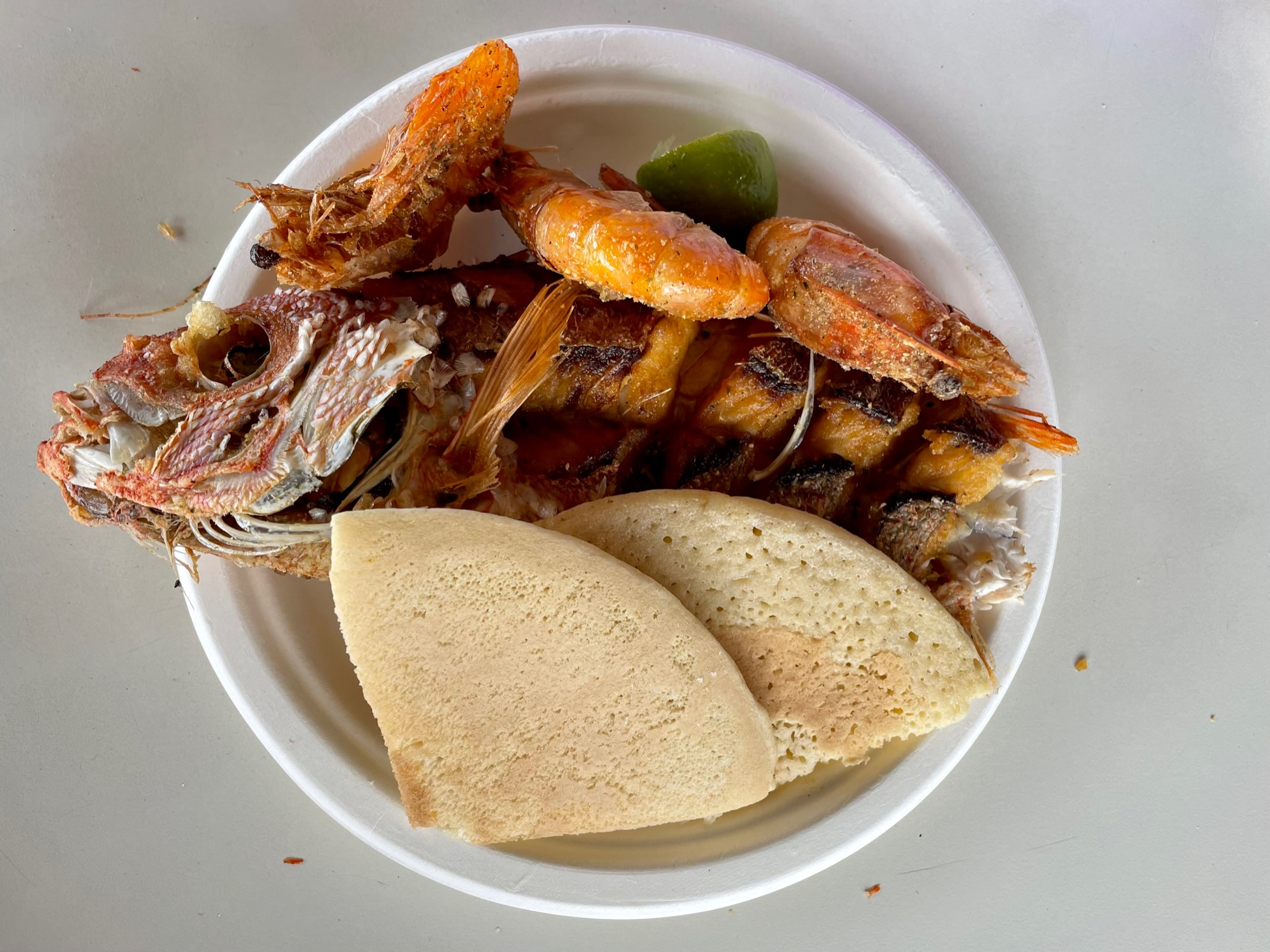
Fried piska cora (red snapper), shrimp, and pan bati.

==== Spanish influence ====
Aruba became a Spanish colony in 1499. Under Spanish rule, the Arawak people of the island adopted some of the Spaniards' food practices. Before the arrival of the Spaniards, the indigenous people cooked their food by boiling, steaming, roasting (barbacoa, now known as barbecue), or dry-frying on a clay plate (the comal). Sometimes, they even ate their food raw. They learned to use pig as a source of food and how to use its fat for frying. To enhance the flavor, they used coui, a sauce made from cassava juice and various types of pepper. They also began using annatto for its red-orange color and were introduced to salt. Other new foods included mango, lemon, and olive, brought by the Spaniards from Asia. Initially, they used honey as a sweetener, but the Spaniards introduced sugar.

==== Dutch influence ====
After the Dutch West India Company acquired Aruba in the early 17th century, the Dutch introduced cheese, bacon, and various types of beans, such as kapucijner and peas. Dutch workers who came to work at the oil refineries (Lago Oil and Transport Company and Arend Petroleum Company) brought changes to the local food culture. This influenced many people to shift their hot evening meals to a simpler bread-based meal. People started to learn about different sandwich fillings and how to use them, including the use of cheese as a sandwich filling. The consumption of potatoes and canned vegetables also became more common.

==== Sephardic Jewish influence ====
In the mid-17th century, Sephardic Jews, who had previously migrated from Spain and Portugal, and later settled in Dutch Brazil, were granted permission by the Netherlands to establish themselves on the Dutch ABC islands. The arrival of Sephardic Jews influenced the local cuisine with various Spanish and Portuguese culinary influences, giving it a distinct character. One noteworthy aspect was their use of combining sweet and sour ingredients, including capers, dried plums, olives, and raisins, in a single dish. They also introduced the cooking method au bain marie to the existing culinary practices.

==== African influence ====
In the early 18th century, enslaved Africans were imported to Aruba by the Dutch. Although Aruba had smaller numbers of enslaved Africans compared to other Caribbean islands, they made significant contributions to the local cuisine. These include crucial parts of many Caribbean cuisines, such as the plantain, various types of beans and okra (guiambo). As well as introducing various cooking methods, such as using banana leaves to cook food.

The indigenous people made flat cakes from cassava or corn, while enslaved Africans introduced funchi or funge, similar to Italian polenta. Later, the corn flour mash adopted from the indigenous people was also called funchi. Africans also introduced the lélé wooden stirring stick and iron pots for making funchi. Dried and salted fish, which was the most economical, heat-resistant and primary protein given to the enslaved Africans of the Caribbean, was often paired with funchi or starchy tubers like yams and sweet potatoes.

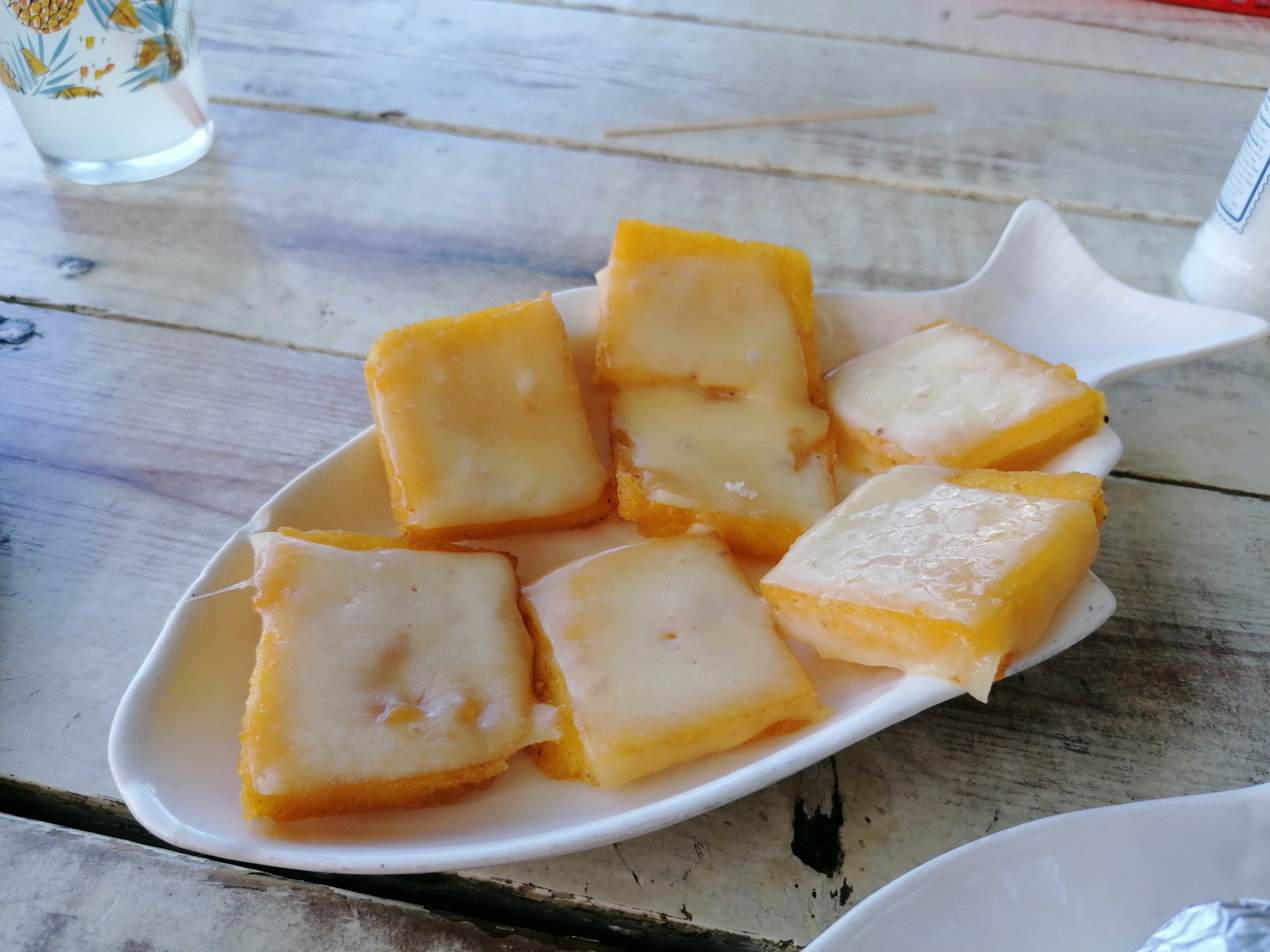
Fried funchi with cheese

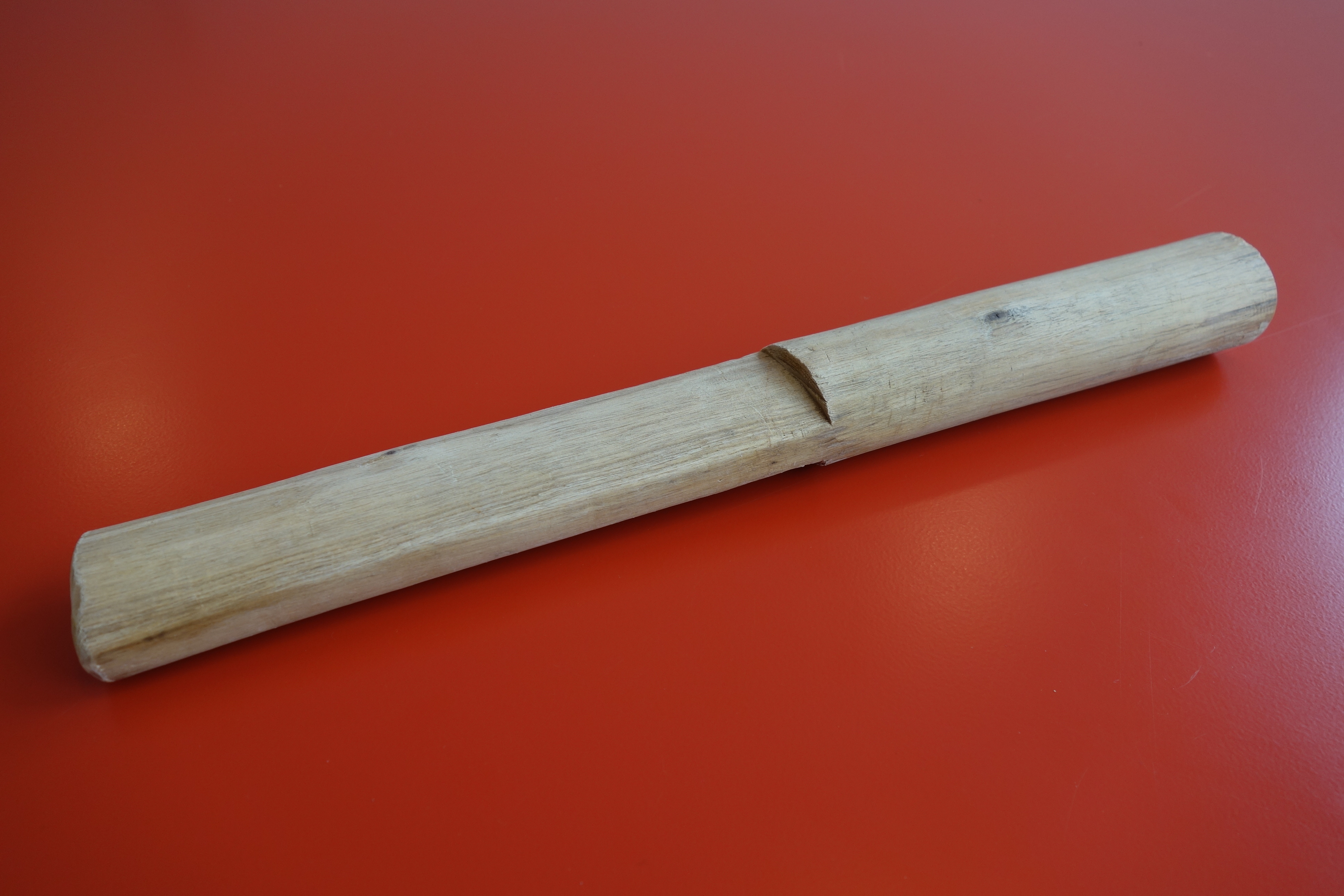
Palo di funchi is a wooden kitchen tool used to prepare funchi.

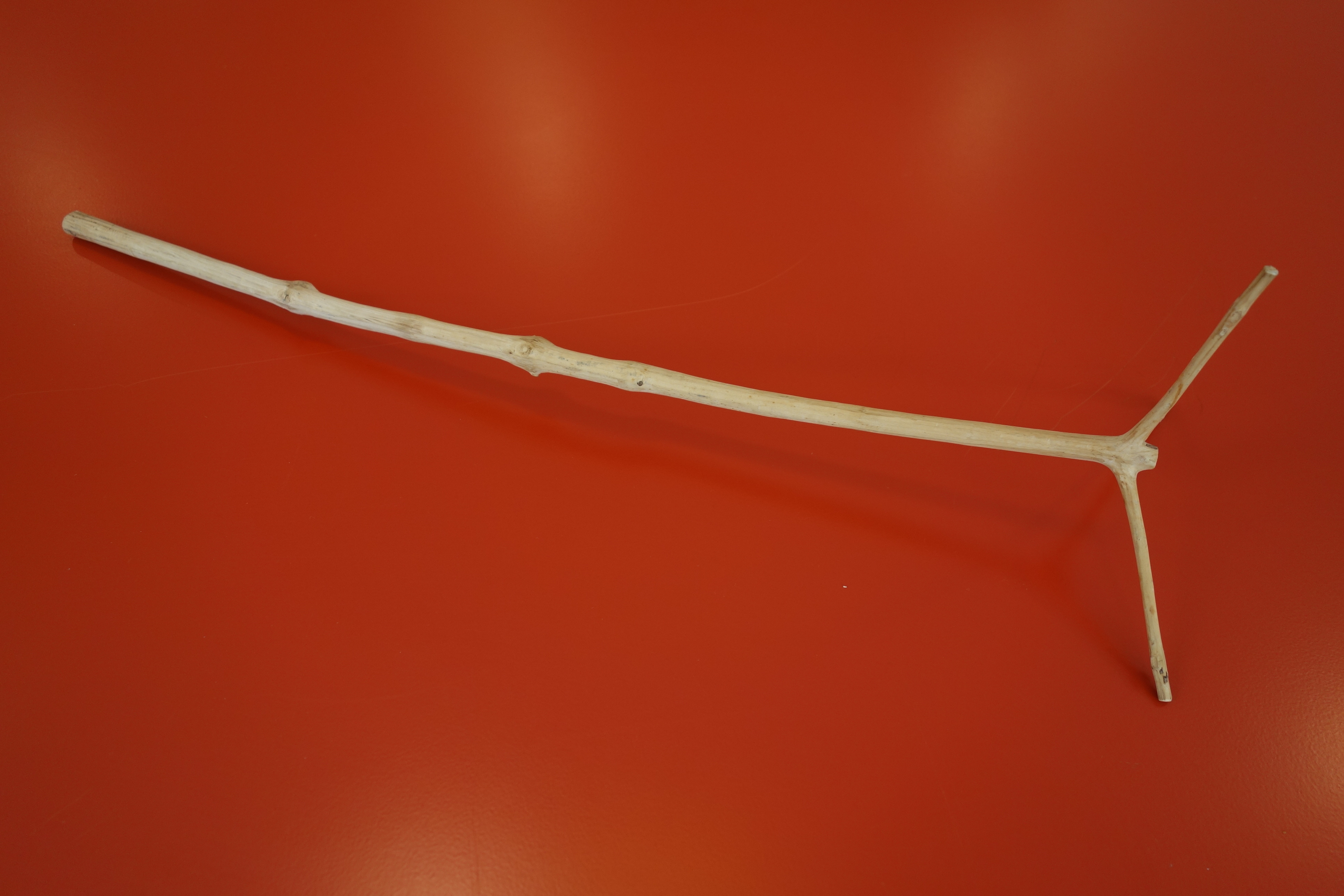
Lélé is used for the preparation of tamarind juice

==== Asian influence ====
After the abolition of slavery, Asian laborers arrived to other Caribbean islands in the late 19th century, bringing with them leafy vegetables like spinach, lettuce, and curds.

Chinese sailors, originally part of their own oil fleet, settled Aruba and opened restaurants. In the 1970s, the first Chinese restaurants, like Dragon Phoenix in 1971 and Kowloon in 1975, were established in Aruba.

During the Second World War, Indonesian sailors of the Royal Dutch Navy were stationed on the island. When they left after the war, they left behind dishes like nasi goreng, bami goreng, and satay, which gradually blended into the local cuisine. In 1955, the floating Bali restaurant opened its doors in Aruba.

==== United States influence ====
The Americans stationed on Aruba during the Second World War brought Coca-Cola and various bottled soft drinks.

=== Specialities ===
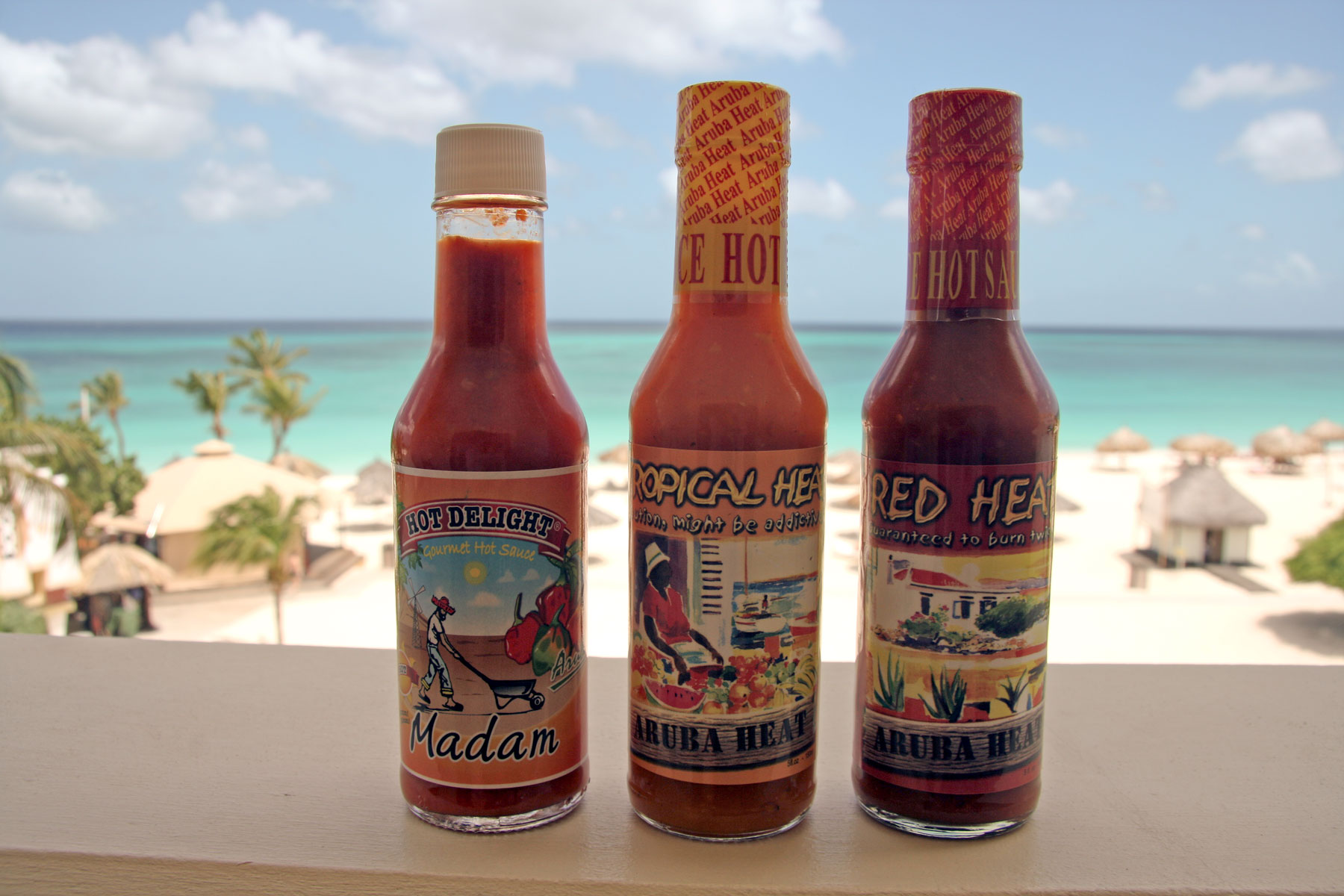
Papaya-based Aruban hot sauces

Local cuisine often features the use of regional papaya-based hot sauces, locally known as pica di papaya, in both accompaniments and cooking.

=== Dishes ===
==== Ayaca ====
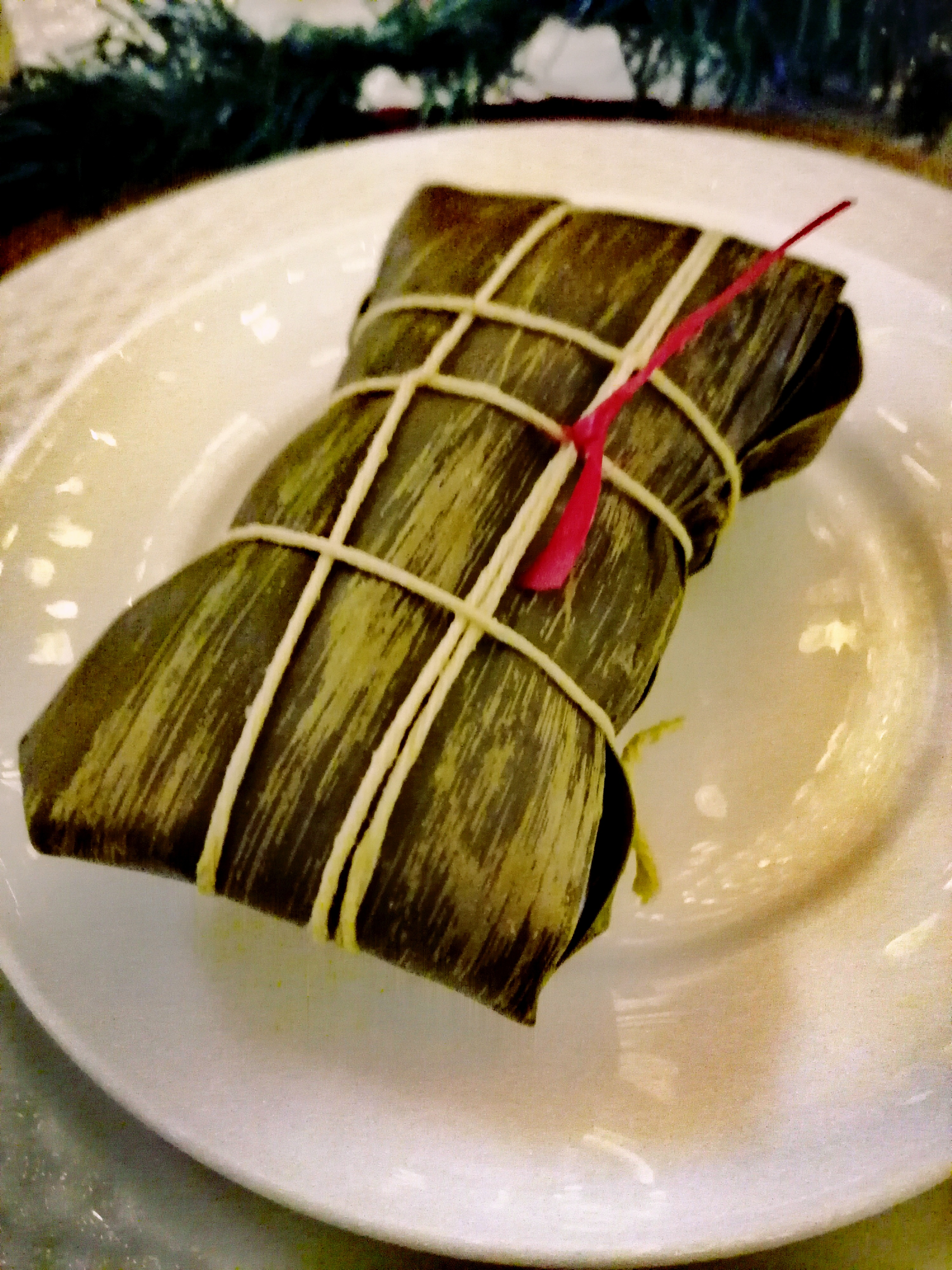
Ayaca is a type of tamal wrapped in banana leaves. The red lint signifies the spiciness level: hot

The ayaca is a dough of white corn flour, also known as masa harina, sugar, salt, aniseeds, finely grated cheese, butter and milk spread thinly is placed on a banana leaf. A stuffing consisting of stewed chicken and pork, capers, raisins, plums, olives, piccalilli, ham, peeled almonds, celery, parsley, gherkins and chili pepper is placed on top. The banana leaf is closed and made into a small, neat package, which is wrapped in a second leaf and then tied with packing string and boiled in boiling water. The prepared ayacas are then allowed to cool. Shortly before serving, the ayaca is warmed up and eaten stripped of the banana leaves. Ayacas are made and eaten during the Christmas and New Year holidays.

==== Keshi yená ====
The keshi yená (stuffed cheese) is traditionally made from a hollowed-out red Edam cheese. The cheese is soaked and stripped of the red wax layer, and then filled with a meat or fish filling, including capers, raisins, plums and olives. In a well-fitting form it is then prepared in a bain-marie or put in the oven. The heat softens the cheese rind. At the end of the baking time, the keshi yená is turned out onto a plate to cool, cut like a cake and served. For convenience, instead of the hollowed-out, round Edam cheese, which gives the dish its typical taste and soft pink color, a tin baking sheet may be lined with slices of Gouda cheese. Similarly to the ayaca, the keshi yená is often served as an hors d'oeuvre.

==== Sancocho ====
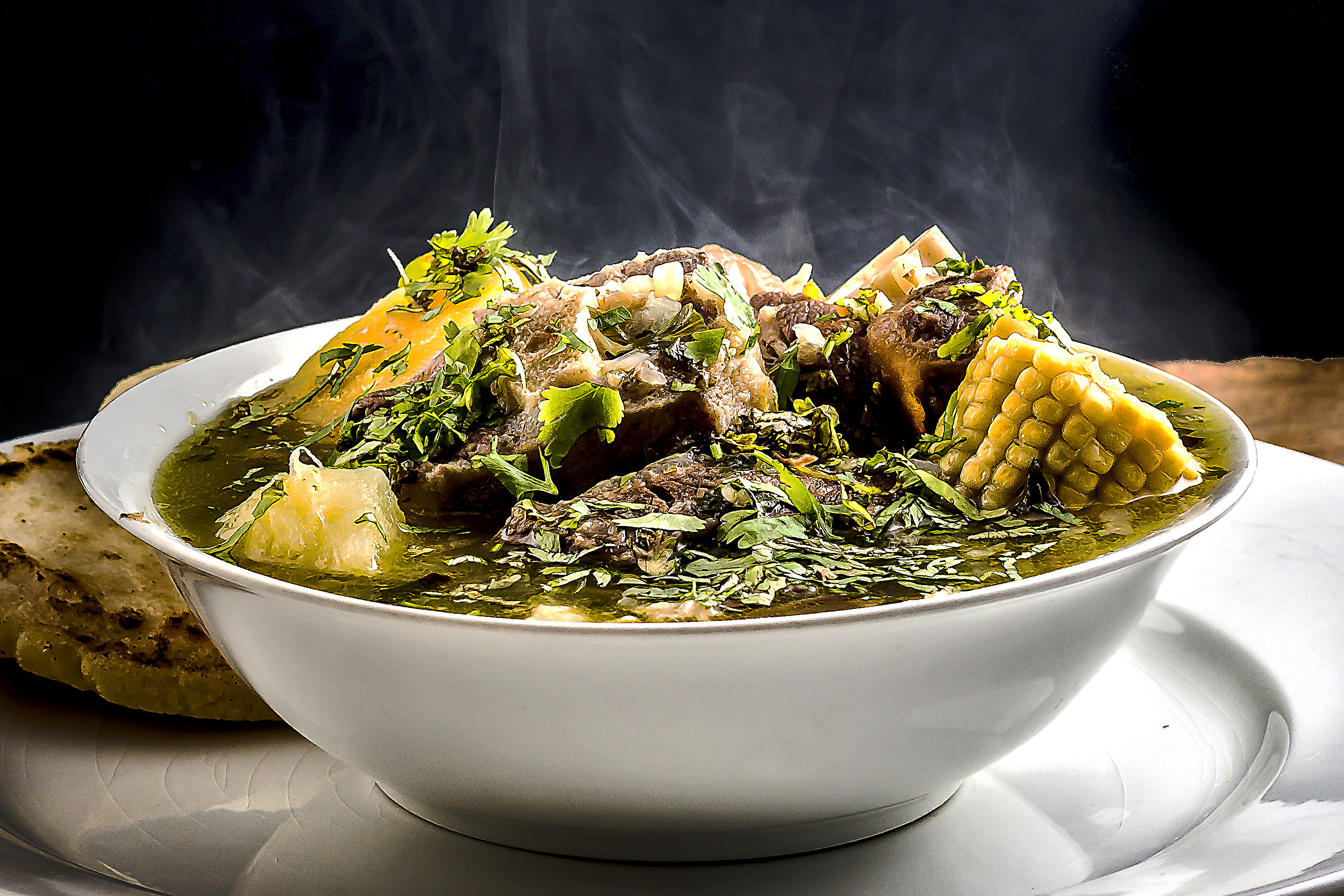
Sancocho with chicken, oxtail, and beef rib

Sancocho is a typical example of a soup as a main course. In addition to fresh and salted meat, this dish contains vegetables, plantain, tubers, corn on the cob, and both sweet and regular potatoes.

==== Sopi mondongo ====
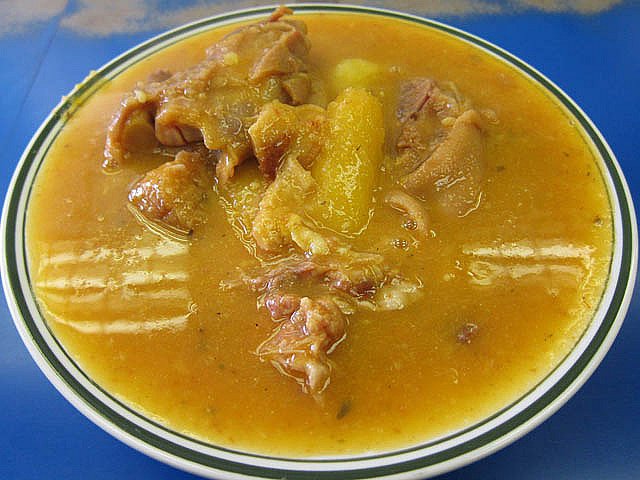
Mondongo soup with chunks of pig's feet, rubbery skin, tripe, and plantain.

Mondongo is a stewed tripe dish made from the stomachs and hooves of cattle or goat. This stew, like so many other local specialties, is quite expensive. A thinner variant of this is also made, known as sòpi di mondongo (tripe soup).

After being thoroughly cleaned and washed with plenty of lamunchi (lime), the stomachs are parboiled and cut into small pieces. Capers, raisins, plums, olives and most of the sankocho ingredients are added later and the whole thing is simmered over a low heat. Finally, cognac or sherry is added. Foreign visitors sometimes call the stewed mondongo the "Dutch Caribbean pepperpot".

==== Sopi yambo ====
The yambo dish is a thick hearty okra soup. Yambo can be as simple or rich as one would like. A rich yambo contains cured meat and pig tail, fish, cheese, shrimp and kalko (conch meat) paired with funchi. This dish is not popular with many, especially foreigners, due to the slipperiness of the dish.

Aruban snacks and sweets
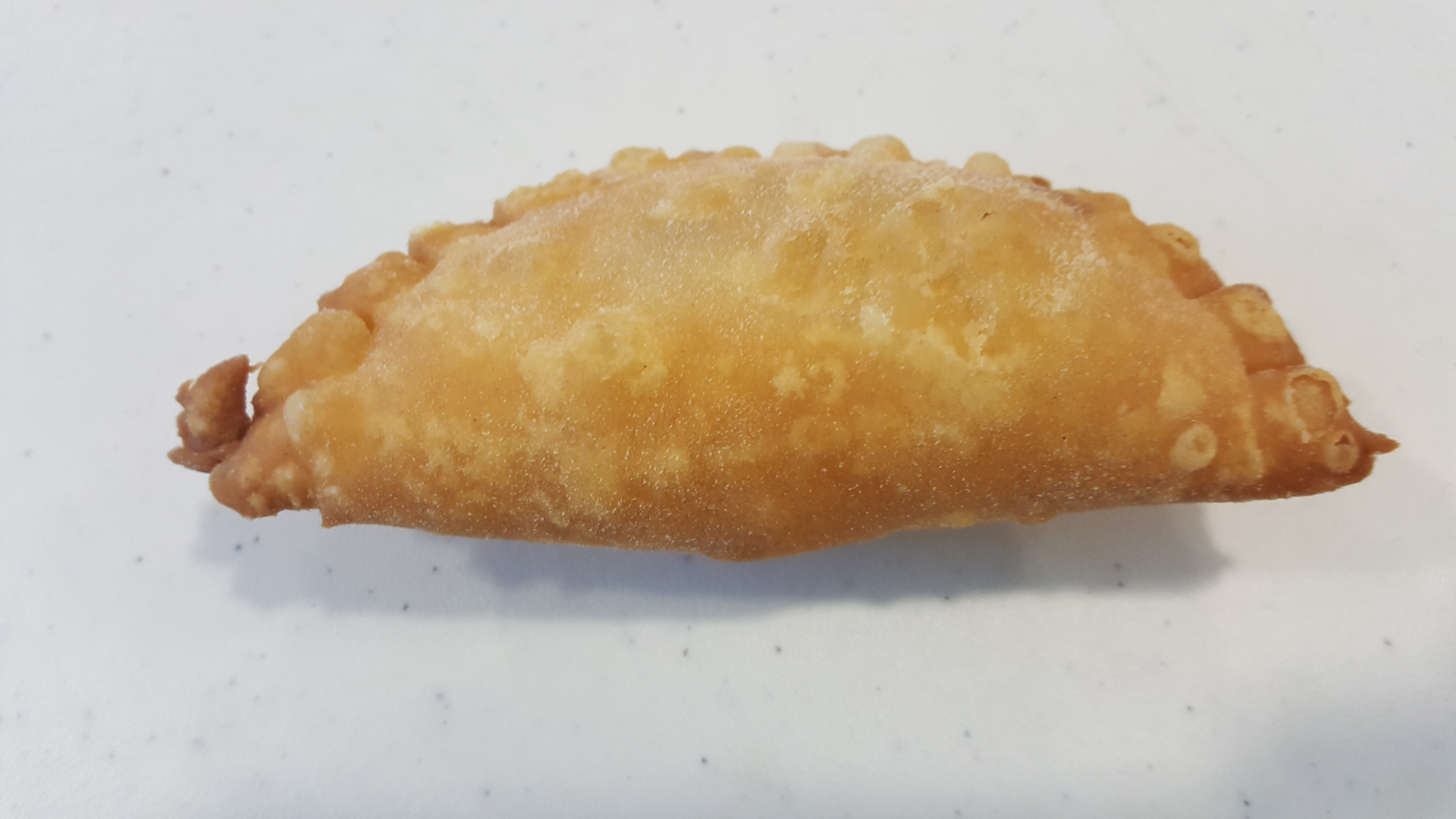
Pastechi is a traditional Aruban breakfast or snack filled with chicken, beef, tuna, conch, chop suey, or (ham) cheese.

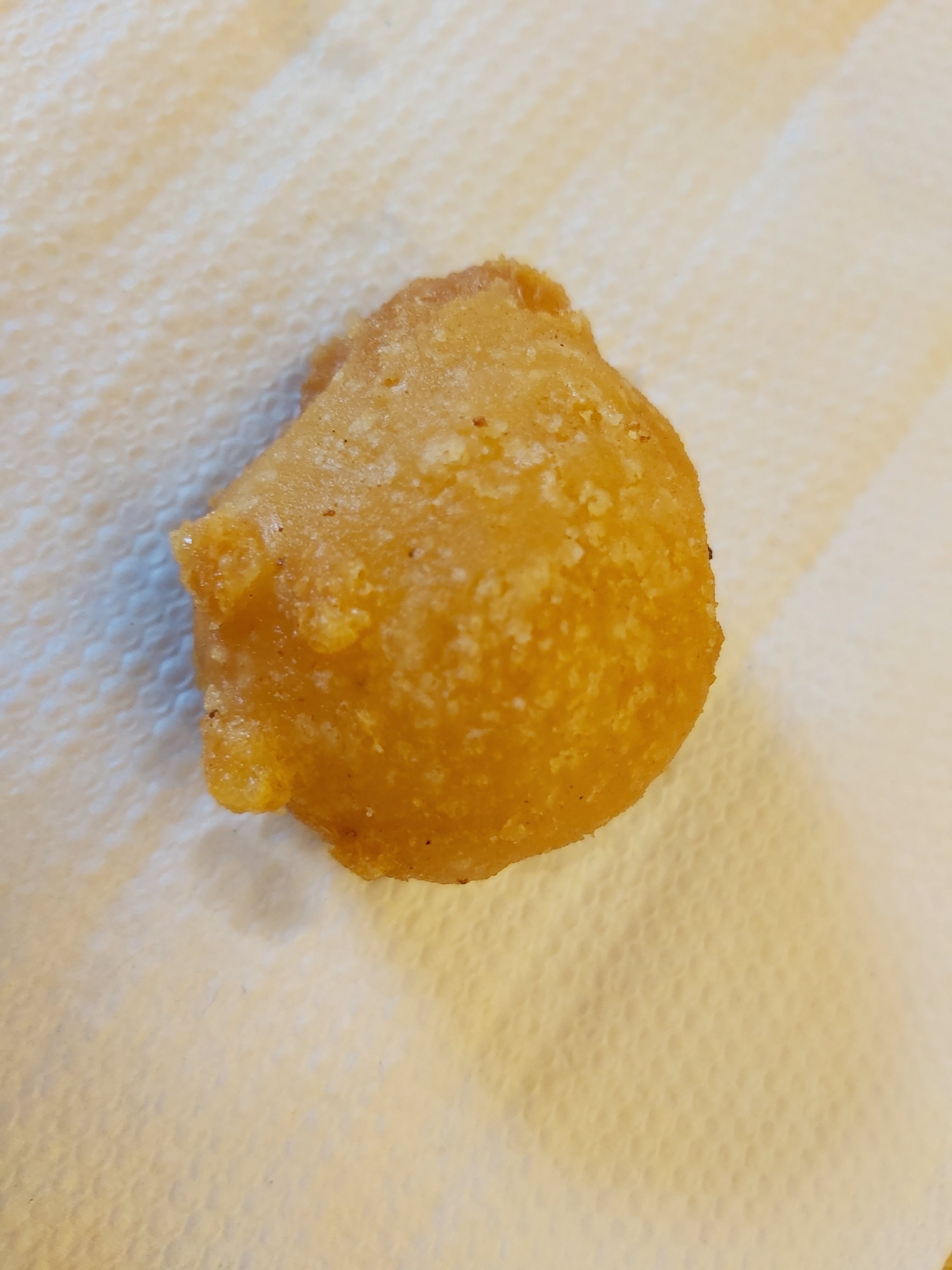
Bolita di keshi (cheese balls) filled with sharp cheese (cheddar) and some lighter white cheese (feta and ricotta).

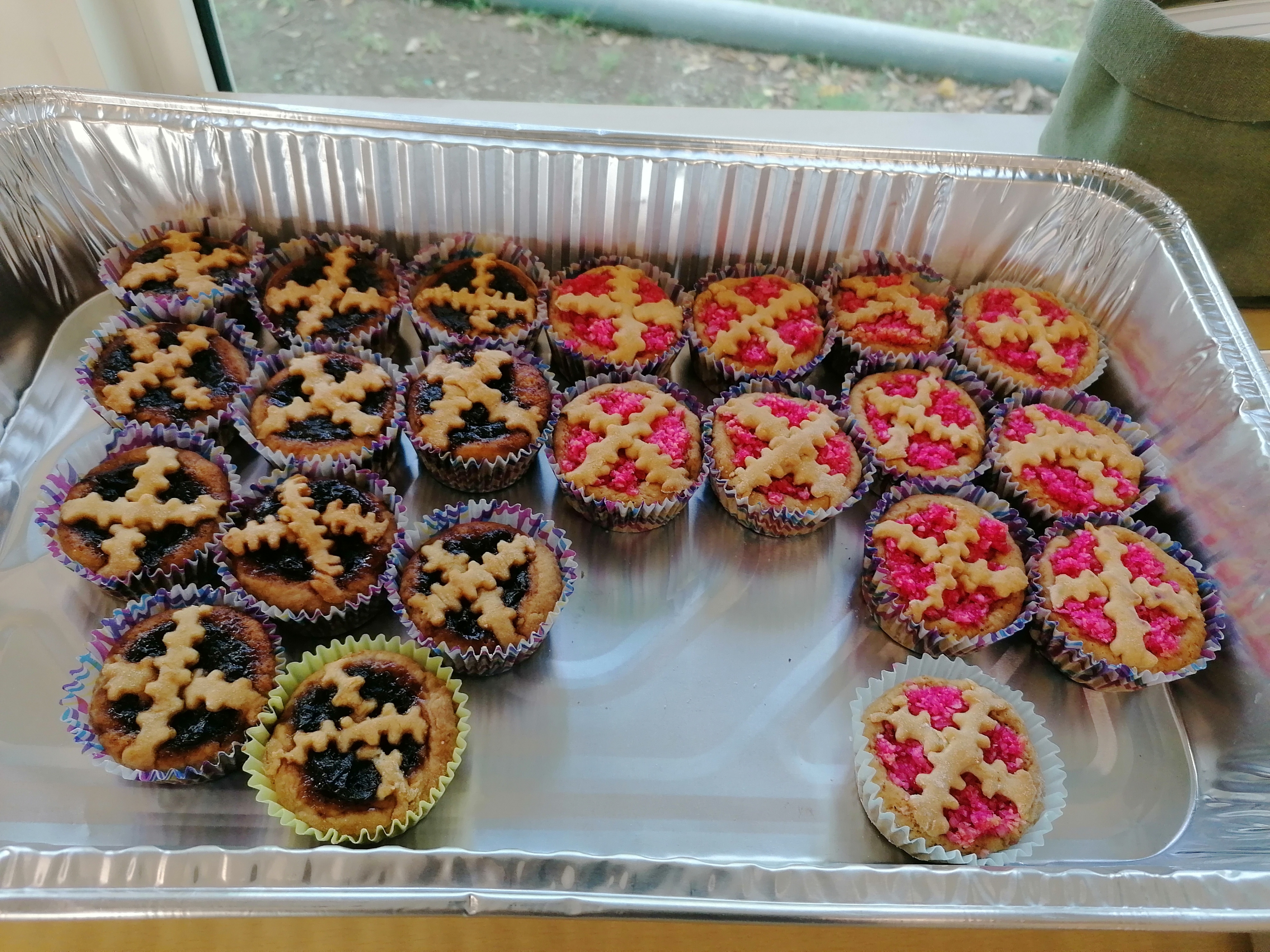
Tert are prune- or coconut-filled tarts.

== Festivals ==
=== Festivals and celebrations ===
==== Dera Gai ====
Dera Gai is a traditional celebration in Aruba, and nearby Curaçao and Bonaire, particularly associated with Dia di San Juan (St. John the Baptist Day) on June 24. In the past, it involved lighting bonfires on the eve of St. John's day, signaling the upcoming holiday. Bonfires were fueled by the remains of the previous year's harvest, a practice symbolizing preparation for the new growing season. Men, fueled by singing and music, used to leap over the flames, but this custom faded due to concerns about fire safety. Nowadays, fires are lit all over the island on St. John the Baptist Day itself.

A persistent belief advises against fishing or swimming on St. John's Day due to strong northeast trade winds. In Aruba, the celebration takes the form of Dera Gai, an Aruban harvest festival and cultural event featuring traditional song and dance. Songs were played by violin, guitar, wiri, and tambú. The festival includes a unique ritual, historically involving the symbolic burial of a rooster.

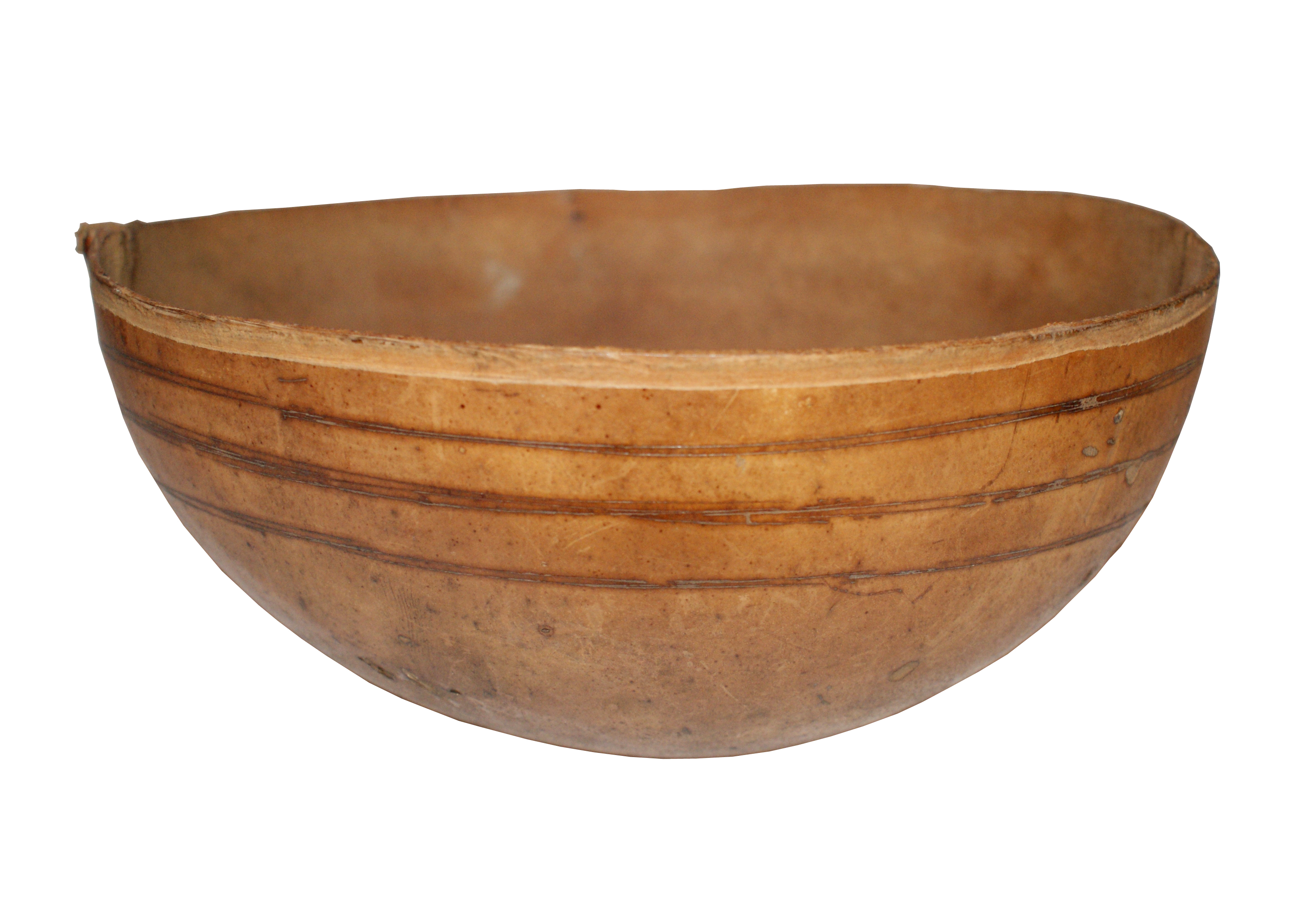
Dried calebash

In the traditional Dera Gai ritual, a hole is dug, and a rooster is placed inside with only its head protruding often covered with a green or dried Calabash gourd. The rooster symbolizes the betrayal of Jesus Christ by Judas. Participants, blindfolded, attempt to hit rooster encouraged by music and singing. The festivals include symbolic attire with females wearing yellow outfits representing the kibrahacha flower (Tabebuia billbergii), and males donning black trousers, white shirts, and a yellow tie.

This holidays is widely celebrated, with both pagan and Christian symbols that reflect the influences of the Arawak natives and the Spanish missionaries, respectively. This festival is no longer as widely practiced, nowadays, the rooster is omitted, and only the calabash and a plastic rooster serves as the target for the reenactment.

==== Carnival ====
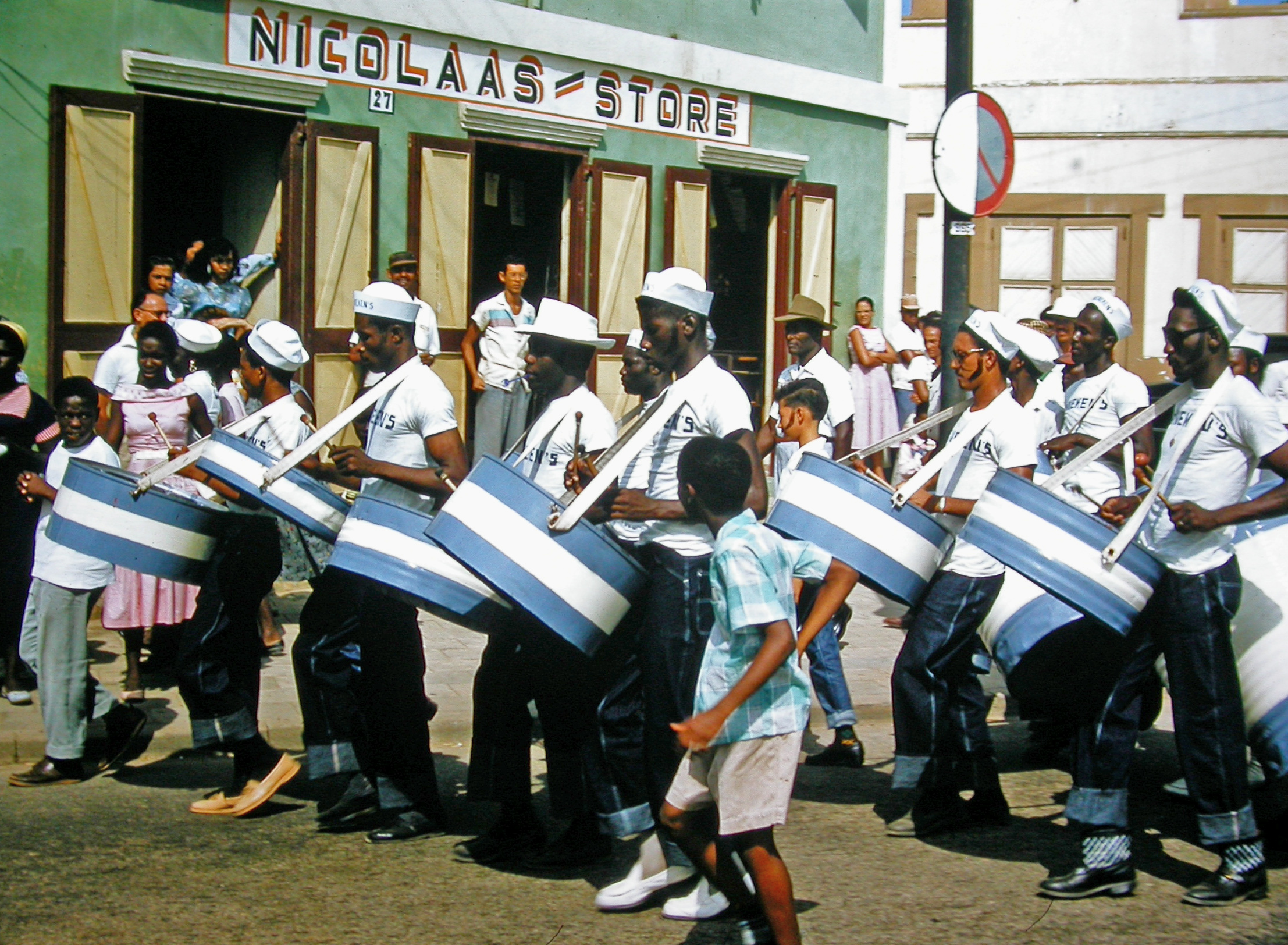
Steel band in a carnival parade at San Nicolaas in the 1950s.

The Allied victory of World War II was commemorated by a large parade in San Nicolas, consisting largely of Caribbean-English immigrants who came to Aruba to work at the Lago Oil Refinery. The first steel and brass bands debuted a few years later and small parades sprouted here and there. Groups within the Aruban elite have taken up this celebration and expended it further. Aruba Tivoli Club, a private social club, started in 1944 with small celebrations.

In 1955, different clubs and districts came together for the inaugural public Aruba Carnival, featuring the first official Carnival queen. The traditional Grand Parades were introduced in 1957. On November 11, 1966, at 11:11 am, the Stichting Arubaanse Carnaval (SAC), the organization responsible for Carnival, was established. The Carnival season officially commences at this exact moment each year. Since 1981, Tivoli has been producing the Lighting Parade, a nighttime parade. Carnival begins with a small Fakkeloptocht (torchlight parade) that symbolizes the start of the Carnival season. This parade takes place on the first Saturday after New Year.

Every year, Carnival (the big parade) is celebrated on a different date. The timing of Carnival is determined by Easter Day. Easter Sunday, the first Sunday after the first full moon after the beginning of Spring, sets the date for the first day of Carnival day. To find the first Carnival Day, you count back seven weeks or 47 days before Easter. Carnival officially kicks off on a Sunday. Easter can fall as early as March 22 or as late as April 25. As a result, Carnival is celebrated between February 1 and March 7. Following Carnival, there's Ash Wednesday, marking the start of Lent, a 40-day period during which people abstain from eating meat or animal products. These 40 days provide an opportunity for the body to detoxify. After following. Following the period of fasting, Easter arrives.

==== New year ====
The New Year celebration in Aruba also includes a cultural tradition known as Dande. The name Dande, derived from the Papiamento word dandara, meaning "to revel, to carouse, or to have a good time", reflects the festive spirit of the occasion. The celebration originated after King William III of the Netherlands declared slaves to be free.

Typically, a group of five or six people, though more can join, engages in these rituals. Accompanied by a singer, they go door-to-door, offering New Year's wishes through repetitive songs. The chorus includes the phrase ai nobe, meaning "new year", sung after each phrase. The celebratory journey usually leads them to the homes friends and family, where the host collects money in his a hat to give to the group. In some regions, specific dande groups may perform on the second day of the year.

== Society ==
=== Nationality ===
Central Bureau of Statistics indicate that in 2023, the population of Aruba consists of individuals from 148 different countries and represents 97 different nationalities. Nearly two-thirds (64.4%) of the population of Aruba are born in Aruba or the former Netherlands Antilles, 9.7% are born in Colombia, 5.4% in Venezuela, 4.6% in the Dominican Republic, and 4.5% in the Netherlands. Aruba has a mixture of people from South America, Europe, Africa, Asia, and other islands of the Caribbean.

=== Superstition and pagan beliefs ===
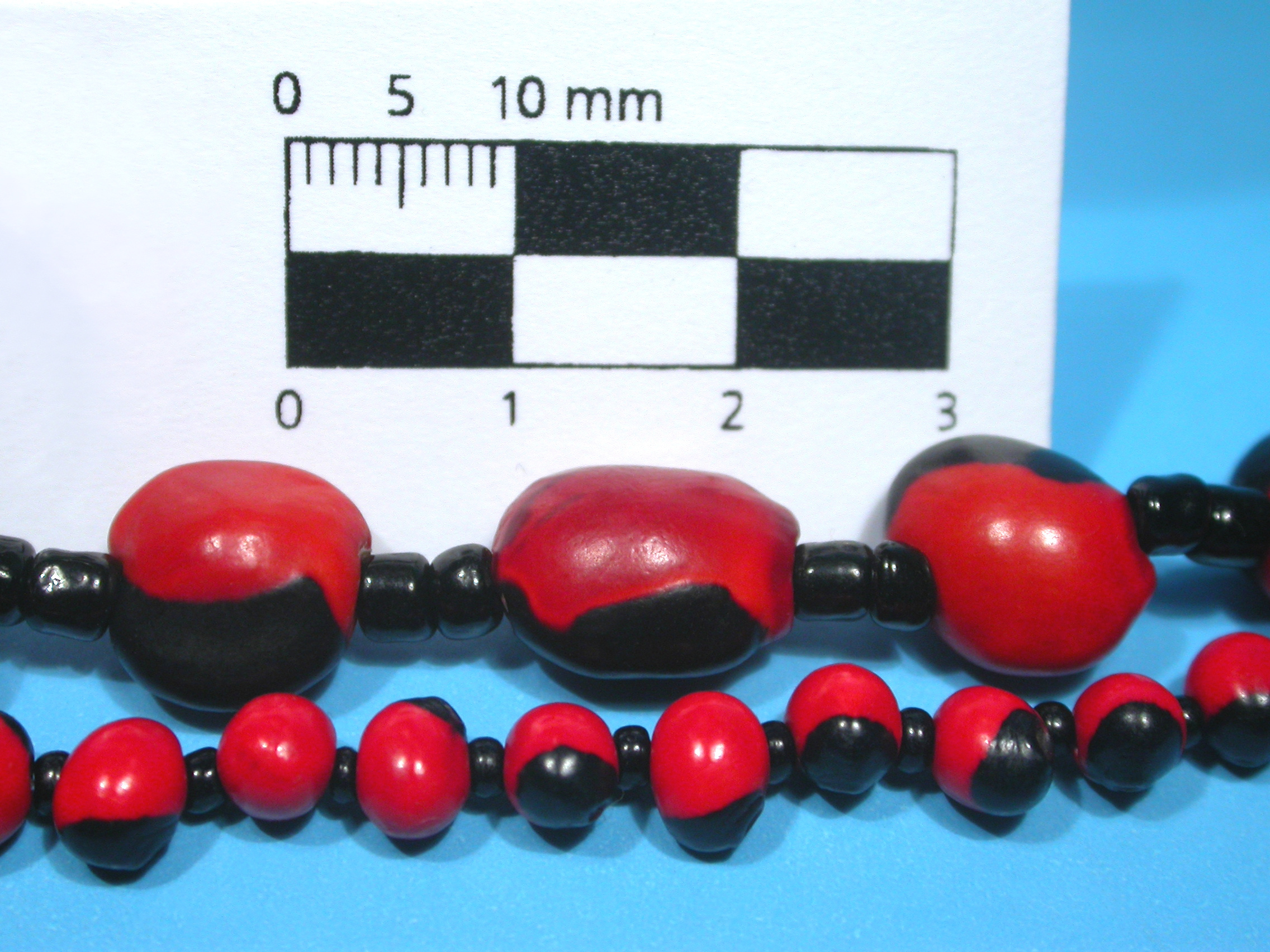
Ormosia coccinea (10 millimetres (0.39 in)) is known as Huayruru, while the smaller Aruban bean Abrus precatorius (5 millimetres (0.20 in)) is called Bonchi hojada.

The origins of beliefs and superstitions in Aruba can be traced back to pre-Columbian times when indigenous peoples inhabited the island. However, after 1820, when the indigenous population disappeared, their cultural heritage and beliefs were lost. Subsequently, with the arrival of African slaves during the seventeenth and eighteenth centuries, some African beliefs and superstitions became integrated into the culture, known as Brujería or Brua. An example of a superstition that aligns with the pagan belief of Brua is ojada or hojada, which is equivalent to the belief in the evil eye. Children, especially newborns, are the most vulnerable and should be protected against the ojada. Bracelets made from Abrus precatorius, locally known as Bonchi hojada ("Bean of hojada"), are worn as amulets for protection against bad spirits.

== Music ==
=== Origin of musical styles ===
The current Aruban population is the product of cultural and racial blending, evident in the diverse influences shaping Aruban music. Little is known about the music of the initial indigenous inhabitants. Aruban music is often seen as a creation of the later island residents. This unique musical style, rooted in the blend of rhythms from various cultures, embodies the distinct characteristics. It features its own rhythm and vitality—sometimes melancholic, usually cheerful, occasionally turbulent yet relaxing, predominantly romantic, and expressive. Notably, Aruban music carries discernible traces of the following influences:

1. European music from the 19th-century Romantic era, notably influenced by Spanish and Viennese styles
2. African folk music, characterized by rhythmic patterns, especially through the widespread use of drum and other rhythmic instruments
3. Impact from neighboring countries and the Caribbean islands.

Here, distinctions are made in Aruban musical styles:
I. African origin (melody, form, and rhythm)

1. Folk
2. Tambu songs
3. Tumba music
4. Harvest songs
5. Dande
6. Occasional songs

II. European origin (melody, form and rhythm)

1. Aruban wals
2. Aruban mazurka
3. Aruban polka
4. Some children song

III. Caribbean and South American origin (melody, form, and rhythm)

1. Aruban danza
2. Calypso

IV. Hybrid forms

1. Tumba Calypso
2. Tumba Carnaval

V. Aruban music crafted for particular instruments

1. Street organ (Caha di orgel)
2. Player piano (pianola)
3. Guitar
4. Record industry
5. Steelpan (steelband)

=== Musical styles ===
The Aruban waltz, exemplified by the national anthem Aruba Dushi Tera, originates from Europe. It's characterized by the unmistakable three-fourths beat of the Viennese waltz. Through rhythm variations within the bar (syncope), the Aruban waltz gains its distinctive flexibility and character, setting it apart from Viennese or Curaçaoan waltzes.

Other European-inspired music styles include the Danza, which also has roots in Europe and is known in places like Puerto Rico and the Dominican Republic. The mazurka, an original Polish dance with a three-fourths rhythm accented on the second beat. Lastly, the Bolero, originally Spanish, with a clear four-four measure, probably arrived in Aruba through Cuban labor migration.

Waltz and Bolero, alongside the Tumba and Merengue, play a vitol roles in the vibrant music legacy shaped by the pioneers of Aruban culture, such as composer and pianist Padu Lampe, renowned as Padu del Caribe, and Victor Camacho. Noteworthy musical groups like Placentero Ritmo y Cuerda and Vicente Kelly have also made significant contributions to this vibrant musical tradition. An Aruban singer and composer, Bernadina Growell, is widely acknowledged as the mother of Aruban culture.

Tumba holds a place in the ABC islands similar to what merengue does in the Dominican Republic, calypso in Trinidad, and son in Cuba. Originally a two-part dance set to a 2/4 time signature (now often in 6/8), Tumba, at the dawn of the 20th century, served as a vehicle for songs of satire and ridicule. What was once a means for the community to convey gossip through song has evolved to nurture professional songwriters.

In 1971, Tumba was officially designated as the national style for the annual Carnival Road March and Tumba festival. Much like Trinidad, Curaçao, and Aruba, these celebrations include competitions to crown the E Rey di Tumba (King of Tumba). The festivities begin with lively parades and jump-up events. The finals are broadcast throughout the entire island group, with live radio connections to the Netherlands, allowing the vast Antillean community to cheer for their favorite performers.

=== Tradition and modernity in Aruban music ===
In Aruban music, a fusion of tradition and modernity has emerged, by musicians like Ivan Jansen, Delbert Bemabela, Ivan Quandus, and Cuban saxophonist Eduardo Proveyer. This blend seamlessly incorporates traditional Aruban rhythms such as danza, waltz, merengue, tumba, and steelpan music into a modern cross-over genre, giving rise to Aruban Crioyo Jazz. Described by Jansen as "a fusion of Caribbean rhythms and adventurous jazz improvisations", this musical direction has gained popularity, exemplified by events like the Caribbean Sea Jazz Festival (which concluded in 2019).

Notable bands like Claudius Philips' Oreo, BMW, and Basic One play a crucial role in preserving the Afro-Caribbean musical tradition introduced by Caribbean migrants in the first half of the twentieth century. The younger generation of musicians, including professionals, semi-professionals, and amateurs, infuse rock, reggae, rock, and hip-hop into the evolving Aruban musical landscape. Aruban musical landscape. The heightened interest in South American rhythms like Vallenato, spurred by increased migration in the 1990s, has further diversified the local musical scene. As Aruban music extends its global reach, it embraces diverse styles, from classical and funk to Latin jazz, rock, reggae, and hip-hop.

== Cinema ==
The CineAruba foundation, established in 2010, strives to supports the sustainable growth of the local film industry by providing multidisciplinary workshops, producing original feature-length movies and short films, and promoting cultural awareness. CineAruba's endeavors have garnered 5 film awards and facilitated 28 international screenings. Abo So (2013) stands out as Aruba's inaugural feature-length movie and musical, featuring music from Padu del Caribe. The film explores identity and examines how different ethnicities in Aruba interact and handle prejudice. Original content from CineAruba also includes three narrative short films, including 10 Ave Maria (2011), Awa Brak (2012), and Alto Vista (2015). Aruba's first five-episode fictional television series, Ciudad Oraño, premiered in 2018 and was broadcast on Telearuba 13. Events such as Playa Film Festival, Shortcutz Aruba, and Rooftop Film Club, and 48 Hour Film Project Aruba promote cultural diversity of the Caribbean, provide a platform for emerging talent, offer an open-air cinematic experience, and host an annual 48-hour film competition, respectively.

== Visual arts ==
The inaugural Art Fair in September 2016 marked the beginning of Aruba's street art scene, with San Nicolas emerging as the focal point. The Main Street of San Nicolas features vibrant art murals created by both local talents and renowned international artists.

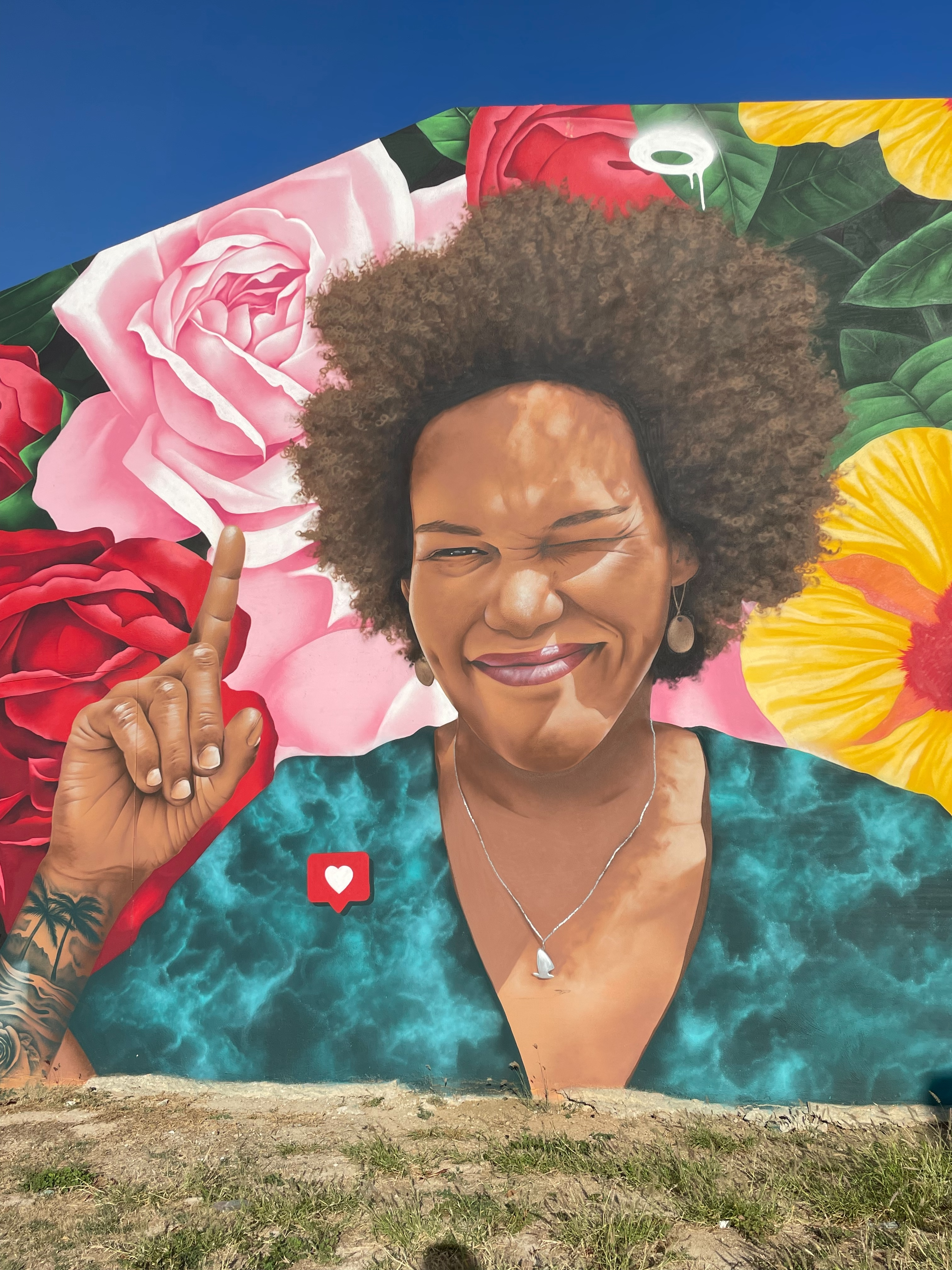
Mural of Sarah-Quita Offringa by Portuguese artist MR Dheo (2022)

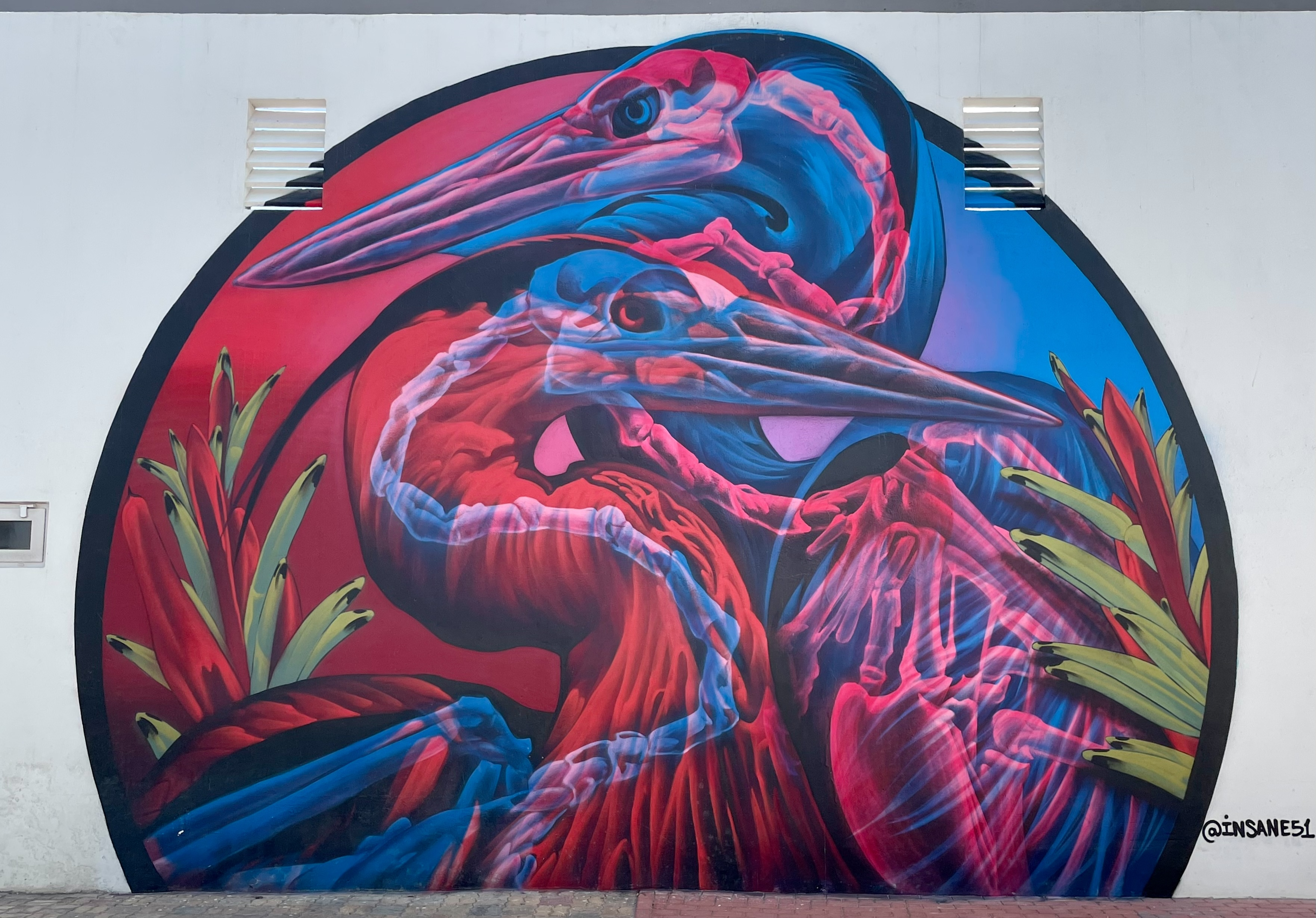
Three-dimensional illusionary effect by Stathis Tsavalias (Insane51)

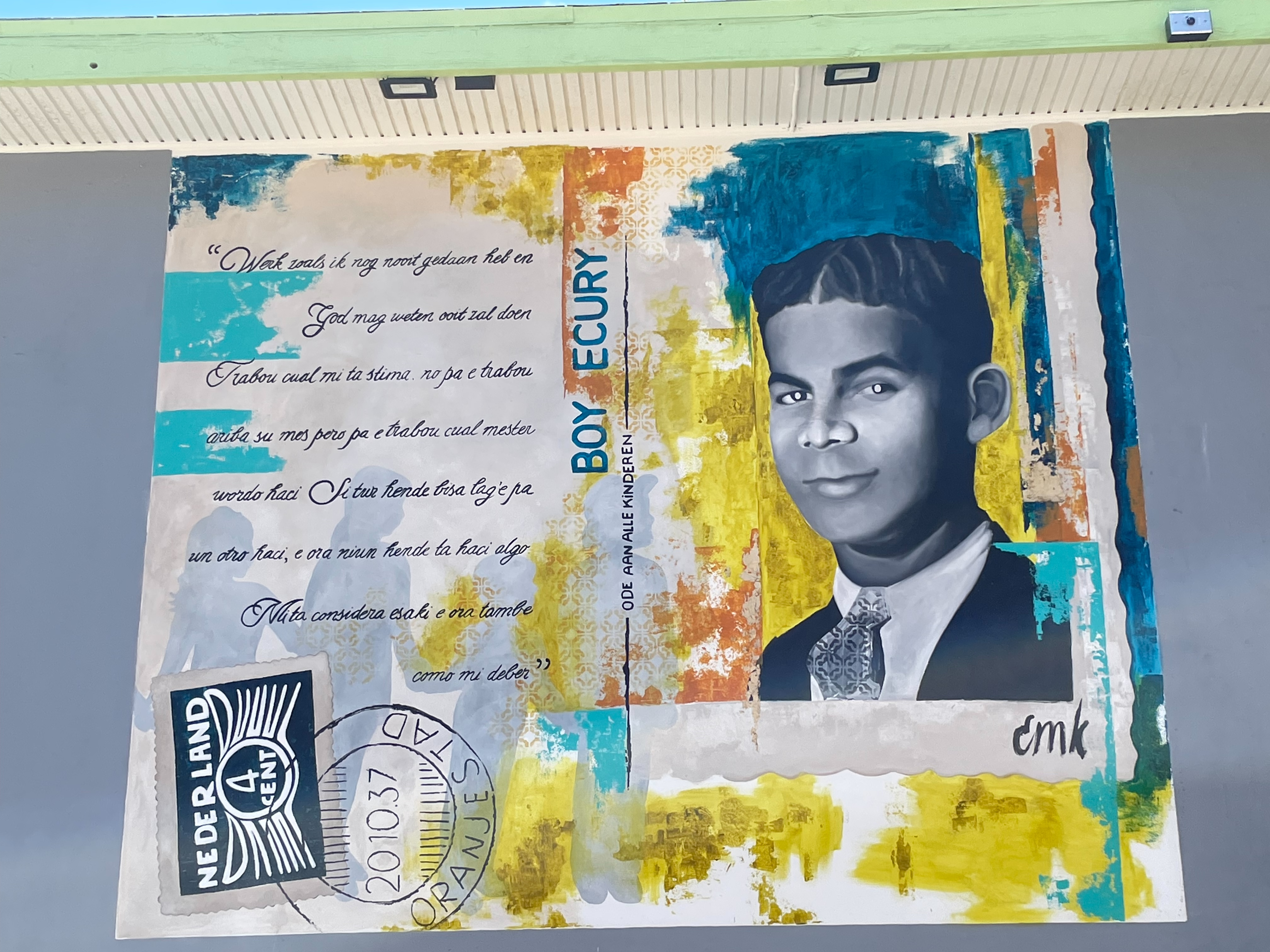
Boy Ecury mural created by Esmeralda Kelly (2022)

== Sports ==
=== Football ===
Football (or Soccer) is the dominant sport on the island. Many football pitches (fields) are available for the youth to practice this sport. The Aruba Football Federation is currently the governing organization. The Aruba national football team has also participated in many International events.

=== Baseball ===
In the 1930s, baseball on Aruba was initially limited to United States expatriates residing in the colony and working for Lago. Jim Bluejacket played a pivotal role in boosting the game's popularity within the colony. Beyon the colony, the introduction of baseball to Aruba was facilitated by Venezuelan immigrants and sailors on Venezuelan fishing boats, with notable figures like Felix Garrido, the grandfather of Evelyn Wever-Croes, contributing to its spread. The Amateur Baseball Bond of Aruba (ABBA) was established in 1950, and Aruba became a member of the International Amateur Baseball Association by 1952. The Little League has notably produced five players who reached the major leagues: Calvin Maduro, Gene Kingsale, Radhames Dykhoff, Sidney Ponson, and Xander Bogaerts.

== Sources ==
- Alofs, Luc; Merkies, Leontine (2001). Ken ta Arubiano?: sociale integratie en natievorming op Aruba, 1924–2001 [Who is Aruban?: Social Integration and Nation-Building in Aruba, 1924-2001] (in Dutch). Oranjestad: VAD/De Wit Stores. ISBN 9789990481105.
- Brenneker, Paul (1969–1975). Sambumbu: Volkskunde van Curacao, Aruba en Bonaire (in Dutch and Papiamento). Vol. 1–10. Curaçao: Paul Brenneker.
- Naar, Hubert (Juby) (2004). Origen di celebracion di dia di San Juan [Origin of St. John the Baptist Day Celebrations] (in Papiamento). Oranjestad: Instituto di Cultura Aruba.
- Römer, René A. (1978). Cultureel Mozaïek van de Nederlandse Antillen: Constanten en Varianten [Cultural Mosaic of the Netherlands Antilles: Constants and Variants] (in Dutch). Zutphen: Walburg Pers. ISBN 9789060110836.
- Razak, Victoria M. (2007). "Carnival in Aruba: "A Feast of Yourself"". Trinidad Carnival: The Cultural Politics of a Transnational Festival. Bloomington and Indianapolis: Indiana University Press. pp. 136–160.
