= Caha di orgel =

Music instrument

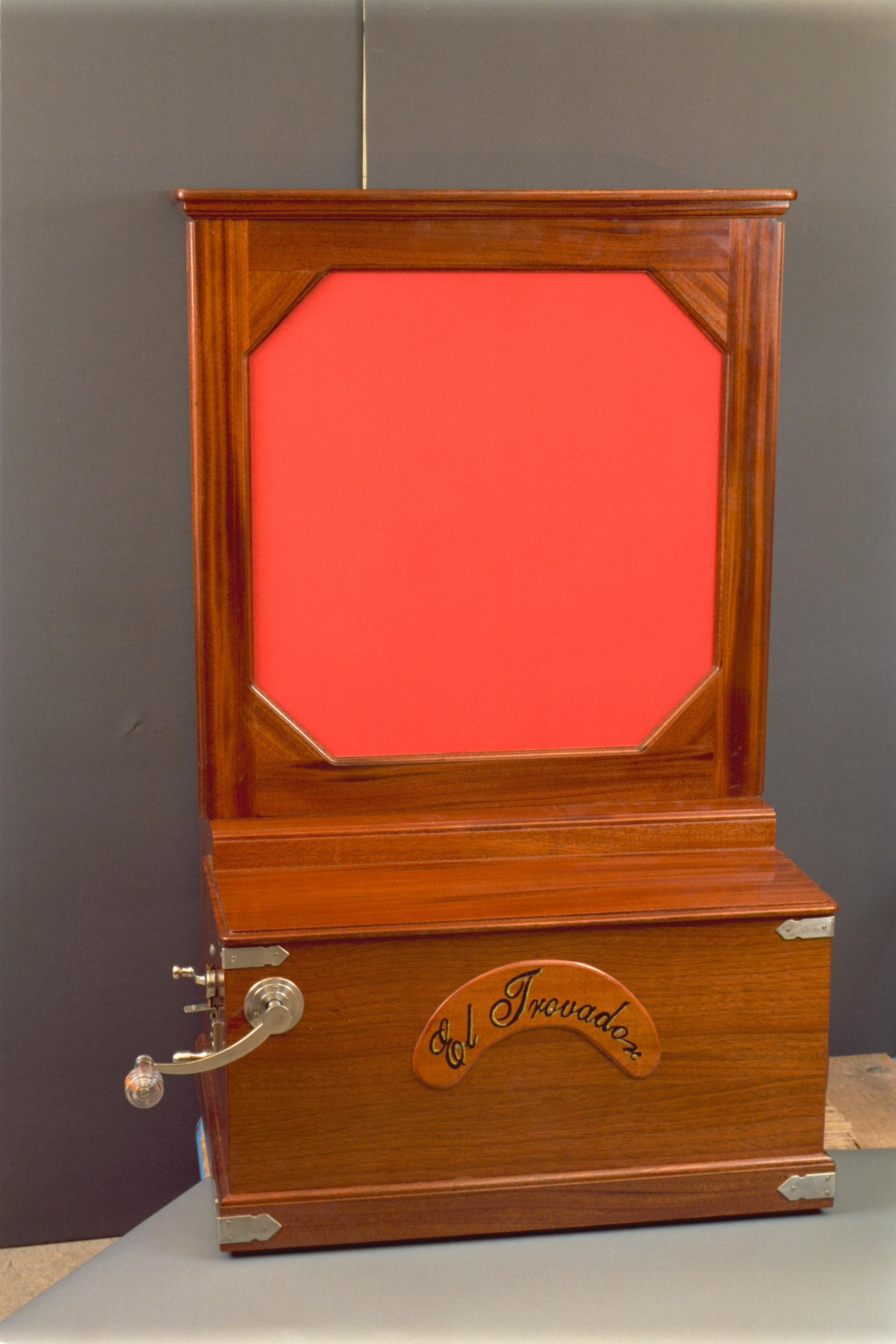
- Wooden L-shaped frame with the soundboard covered in red
- Other names: Caha di musica Tingilingi-box
- Classification: Chordophone

Caha di orgel (/ˈkaha di ˈɔrɡəl/ KAH-hah dee OR-gəl) is a mechanical music instrument that bridges the gap between a barrel piano and an organ.

It plays a significant role in Aruban, Bonairean, and Curaçaoan culture. In the Kingdom of the Netherlands, "Kaha di òrgel" has been officially recognized as part of the country's Intangible Cultural Heritage since 2016.

== Terminology ==
In 1772, London-based company Flight-Robson sold pipe organs with cylinders for mechanical drive. John Hicks, a piano maker in the early 19th century, innovatively used cylinders to propel hammers against strings. This groundbreaking application occurred in an organ builder's workshop, resulting in the misnomers "Organillo" (Spain), "Organetto" (Italy), and "Kaha di òrgel", "Caha di musica", or "Tingilingi box" (Curaçao and Aruba) for cylinder pianos.

== History ==
The first barrel pianos were crafted in Germany and gained popularity across Europe under various names such as street organ, barrel organ, or barrel piano. At the end of the nineteenth century, c. 1880, after Horatio Sprock (1866–1949) encountered it in Barquisimeto, Venezuela, he built the first organ in Curaçao (c. 1912 – c. 1940). From Curaçao, the instrument became known on Aruba and Bonaire. After an initial period of success, interest waned until a revival occurred in the mid-twentieth century on Aruba. Over the years, this tradition has been brought to the Netherlands, where the practice of playing the instrument has been actively embraced. Some players tour the country to provide performances upon request.

In Bonaire, it was a tradition; currently, it is hardly actively practiced on the island. Meanwhile, the Aruban Kaha di òrgel variant is slightly faster than the Curaçao variant.

In the 20th century, notable figures like Rufo Wever (1917–1977) in Aruba (c. 1940) and Edgar Palm (1905–1998) in Curaçao were known for crafting and fine-tuning the cylinders of the caha di orgel. Playing this instrument requires one person to turn the crank while another plays the wiri.

== Design and features ==
The Caha di orgel consists of a wooden (mahogany) sound box with an interchangeable rotating cylinder that can hold a maximum of 8 music pieces (approximately 5,000 small nails). Operated by a crank (manigeta), the cylinder sets the instrument in motion. It is particularly well-suited for specific music genres, including waltz, joropo, tumba, polka, danza, and mazurka. Notably, the cylinder's capacity allows for only half the number of notes compared to a regular piano.

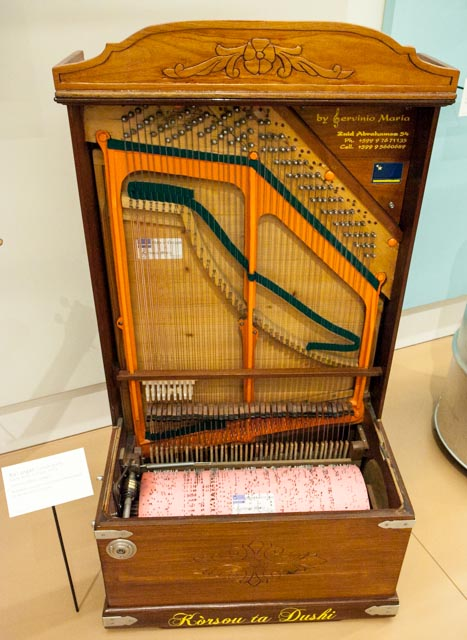
Mechanics inside the Caha di orgel

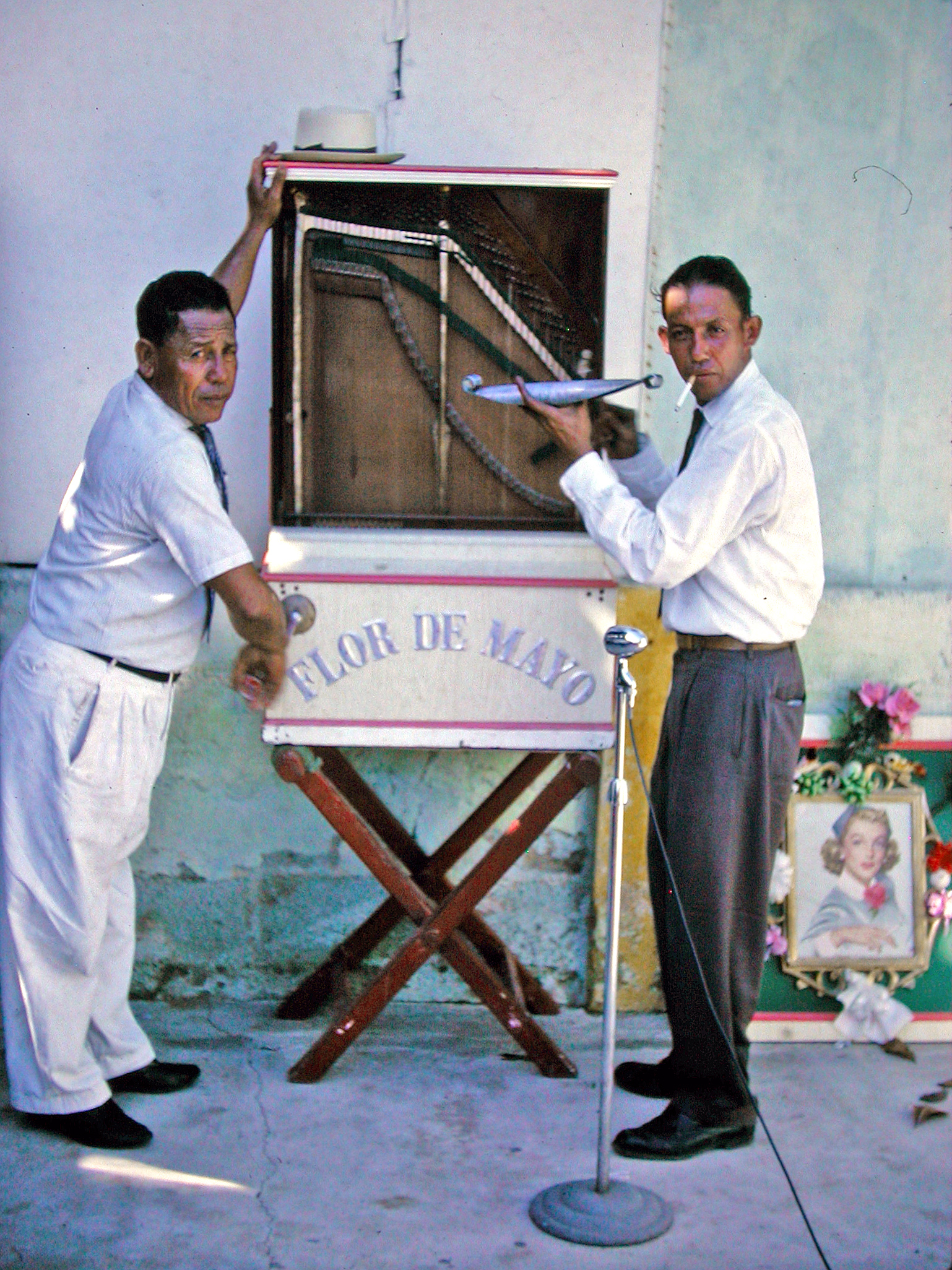
Caja de musica competition, two players (crank, scrape the wiri) (1963)

== Source ==
- Alcalá-Wallé, Marilyn; Parabirsing-Balentina, Herta; Rosaria-Wallé, Nidia (2022). E Cilinder Magico entre Aruba y Curaçao [The Magic Cylinder between Aruba and Curaçao] (in Papiamento). Curaçao. ISBN 978-99904-5-362-1.
- Palm, E.R. (1992). Handleiding bij de studie van onze kaha di orgel [Manual for the study of our kaha di orgel]. PROMUZA.
- Pool, John de (1935). "Music de Baile". Del Curacao que se va [From the Curacao that is leaving]. pp. 38–42 – via Leiden University Libraries Digital Collections.
