= Padú del Caribe =

Aruban musician, writer of the national anthem (1920–2019)

Padú del Caribe (Father of the Caribbean, born Juan Chabaya Lampe; April 26, 1920 – November 28, 2019) was an Aruban musician and songwriter who had been recording and composing for several decades. He wrote "Aruba Dushi Tera", a waltz that is now the national anthem for Aruba and was long a rallying cry for separation from the Netherlands Antilles, which was achieved in 1986.

His music was featured in the 2013 film Abo So.

Juan Chabaya Lampe died on November 28, 2019, at his home in Oranjestad, Aruba, aged 99.

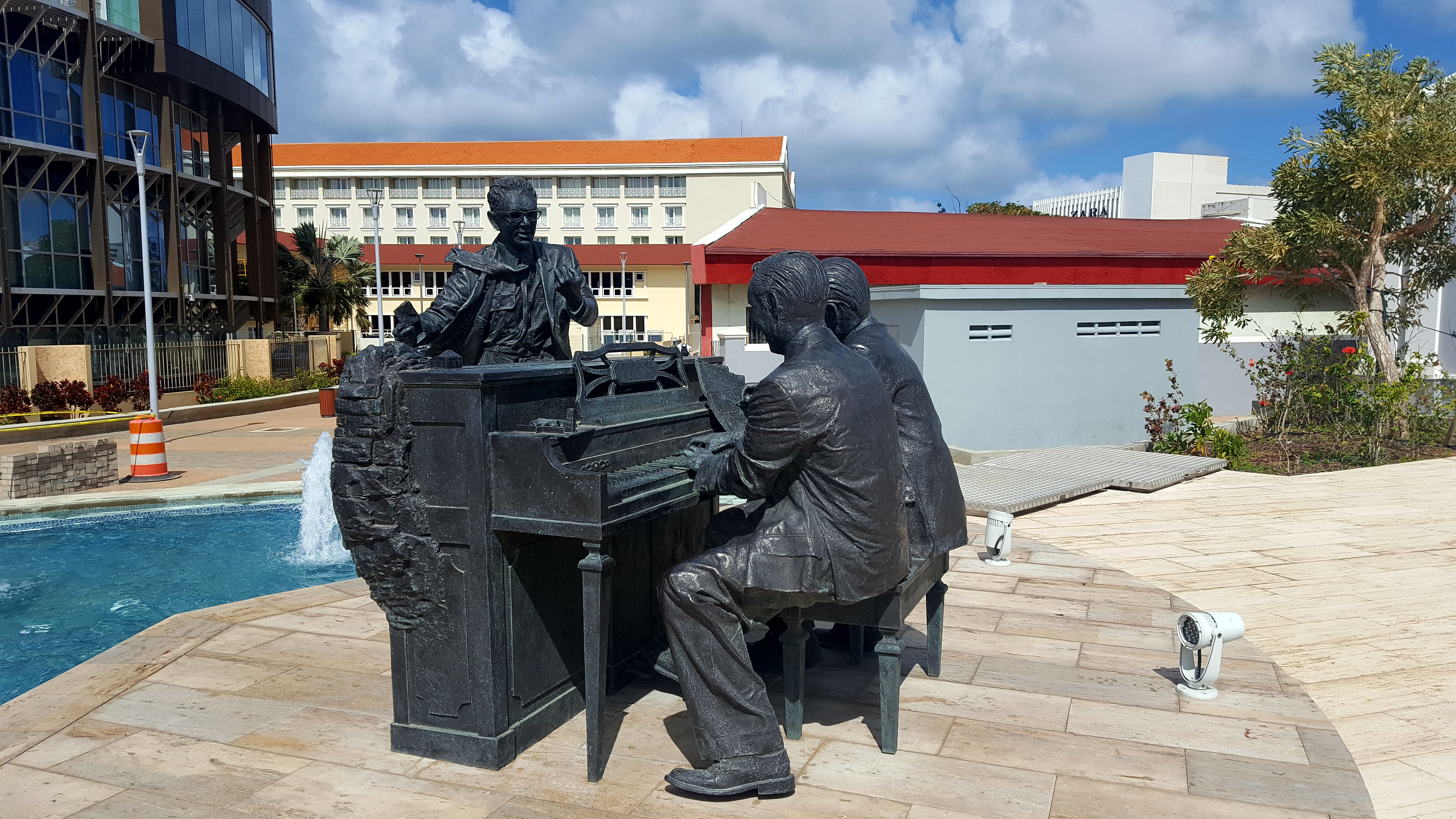
The statue of Padú Lampe, Rufo Wever and Hubert (Lio) Booi, the composers of the national anthem of Aruba. This statue is located on Plasa Padú in Oranjestad, Aruba
