= Aruba Dushi Tera =

National anthem of Aruba

English: "Aruba Sweet Land" or "Aruba Lovely Country"
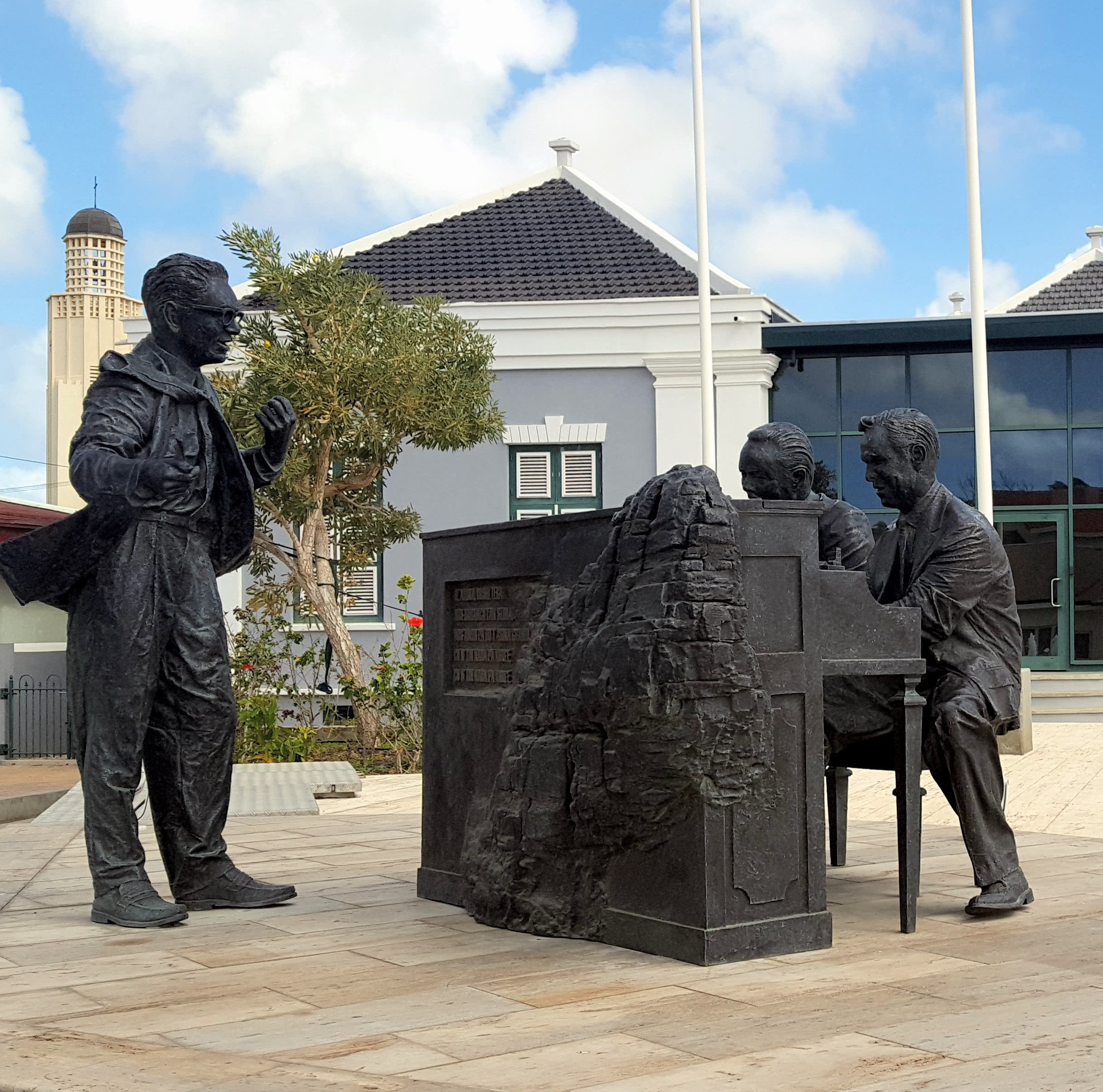
- Statue of Padú Lampe and Rufo Wever, composers of the national anthem of Aruba.
- National anthem of Aruba
- Lyrics: Juan Chabaya Lampe
- Music: Rufo Wever
- Adopted: 18 March 1976

Audio sample
- U.S. Navy Band instrumental version: file; help

"Aruba Dushi Tera" ("Aruba Sweet Land", or "Aruba Lovely Country") is the national anthem of Aruba. It is a waltz written by Juan Chabaya Lampe and composed by Rufo Wever. The last verse was written by Hubert (Lio) Booi. It was accepted as the Aruban national anthem on 18 March 1976. It is written in Papiamento.

== History ==
On 16 January 1976, the Executive Council of Aruba appointed an advisory committee with the assignment to come up with an anthem that took into account "Aruba dushi tera". The song was already very popular among the population and dated from the early 1950s. The committee included Rufo Wever (chairman), Eddy Bennett, Maybeline Arends-Croes and Hubert (Lio) Booi. The committee advised not to alter the melody of the "old" "Aruba dushi tera" into a march but to increase the number of verses. The third verse was written by Hubert Booi.

== Lyrics ==
Papiamento

Aruba patria aprecia
nos cuna venera
Chikito y simpel bo por ta
pero si respeta.

Refran:
O, Aruba, dushi tera
nos baranca tan stima
Nos amor p’abo t’asina grandi
𝄆 cu n’tin nada pa kibr'e. 𝄇

Bo playanan tan admira
cu palma tur dorna
Bo escudo y bandera ta
orguyo di nos tur!

Refran

Grandeza di bo pueblo ta
su gran cordialidad
Cu Dios por guia y conserva
su amor pa libertad!

Refran

IPA transcription (Note: See Help:IPA, Papiamento § Phonology and Papiamento orthography.)

[a.ru.ba pa.trja a.pre.sja]
[nos ku.na ve.ne.ra]
[t͡ʃi.ki.tu‿i sim.pəl bo por ta]
[pe.ro si res.pe.ta]

[re.fran]
[o a.ru.ba du.ʃi te.ra]
[nos ba.raŋ.ka tan sti.ma]
[nos a.mor pa.bo ta.si.na gran.di]
𝄆 [ku‿n.tin na.da pa kib.re] 𝄇

[bo pla.ja.nan tan ad.mi.ra]
[ku pal.ma tur dɔr.na]
[bo‿es.ku.do i ban.de.ra ta]
[or.gu.jo di nos tur]

[re.fran]

[gran.de.sa di bo pwe.blo ta]
[su gran kɔr.dja.li.dat]
[ku djos por gi.a‿i kon.ser.va]
[su‿a.mor pa li.ber.tat]

[re.fran]

English translation

Aruba appreciated native land
our venerated cradle
you may be small and simple
but yet you are respected.

Chorus:
Oh Aruba sweet land
our boulder so beloved
our love for you is so strong
𝄆 that nothing can destroy it. 𝄇

Your beaches so much admired
with palm trees all adorned
your coat of arms and flag
are a pride to us all!

Chorus

The greatness of your people
is their grand cordiality
that God will guide and conserve
their love for liberty!

Chorus

Spanish translation

Aruba patria apreciada
nuestra cuna venerada
aunque pequeña y simple
eres respetada.

Coro:
Oh Aruba tierra querida
nuestro peñón tan amado
nuestro amor por ti es tan grande
𝄆 que nada podrá destruirlo. 𝄇

¡Tus playas tan admiradas
con palmeras todas adornadas
tu escudo y bandera son
orgullo de todos nosotros!

Coro

Grandeza de tu pueblo es
su gran cordialidad
¡Que Dios guíe y conserve
su amor para la libertad!

Coro

Portuguese translation

Aruba, pátria apreciada,
nossa cuna venerada.
Pequena e simples, tu podes ser,
mas és respeitada.

Refrão:
Ó, Aruba, doce terra,
nossa penha tão estimada.
Nosso amor por ti é tão grande
𝄆 que nada o pode quebrar. 𝄇

Tuas praias tão admiradas,
com palmeiras a adornar.
Teu escudo e bandeira são
o orgulho de todos nós!

Refrão

A grandeza do teu povo está
na sua grande cordialidade.
Que Deus guie e conserve,
seu amor pela liberdade!

Refrão

Dutch translation

Aruba gewaardeerd inheems land
Onze vereerde wieg
U kunt klein en eenvoudig zijn
Maar toch gerespecteerd.

Refrein:
Oh, Aruba, mooi land
Onze rots zo geliefd
Onze liefde voor u is zo sterk
𝄆 Dat niets het kan vernietigen. 𝄇

Uw stranden zo bewonderd
Alle met palmbomen versierd
Uw wapen en uw vlag
Zijn de trots van iedereen!

Refrein

De grootsheid van onze mensen
Is hun geweldige hartelijkheid
Die God kan gidsen en bewaren
Zijn liefde voor vrijheid!

Refrein
