= Abo So =

Aruban 2013 film

- Film poster
- Directed by: Juan Francisco Pardo
- Written by: Juan Francisco Pardo
- Produced by: Juan Francisco Pardo; Rebecca Roos
- Starring: Raphaela Mahadeo; Miguel Genser
- Cinematography: Miquel Galofré
- Edited by: Juan Francisco Pardo
- Music by: Padú del Caribe; Adriano Nanof
- Production companies: Audiovisual Institute of Aruba; Rebecca Roos Productions
- Distributed by: Audiovisual Institute of Aruba
- Release date: July 2013
- Running time: 72 minutes
- Country: Aruba
- Languages: Papiamento; Spanish; English

Abo So (Papiamento for "Only You") is a 2013 musical romance film written and directed by Juan Francisco Pardo. Set in Aruba, this Papiamento language film features the music of Padú del Caribe.

== Production ==
The filming was performed over a period of 10 days. The cast worked for free.

== Synopsis ==
A love story between Tatiana, an Aruban Mestiza woman, and Santiago, a Latino man.

== Release ==
Abo So was premiered in Aruba in July 2013. At the Aruba International Film Festival, it won the People’s Choice Award of the Caribbean Spotlight Series.

Abo So was screened at the 2013 Trinidad and Tobago Film Festival.

It was shown at the Bahamas International Film Festival in December 2014, where it won Best Narrative Feature.
