= Pastechi =

Fried food from the Dutch Caribbean

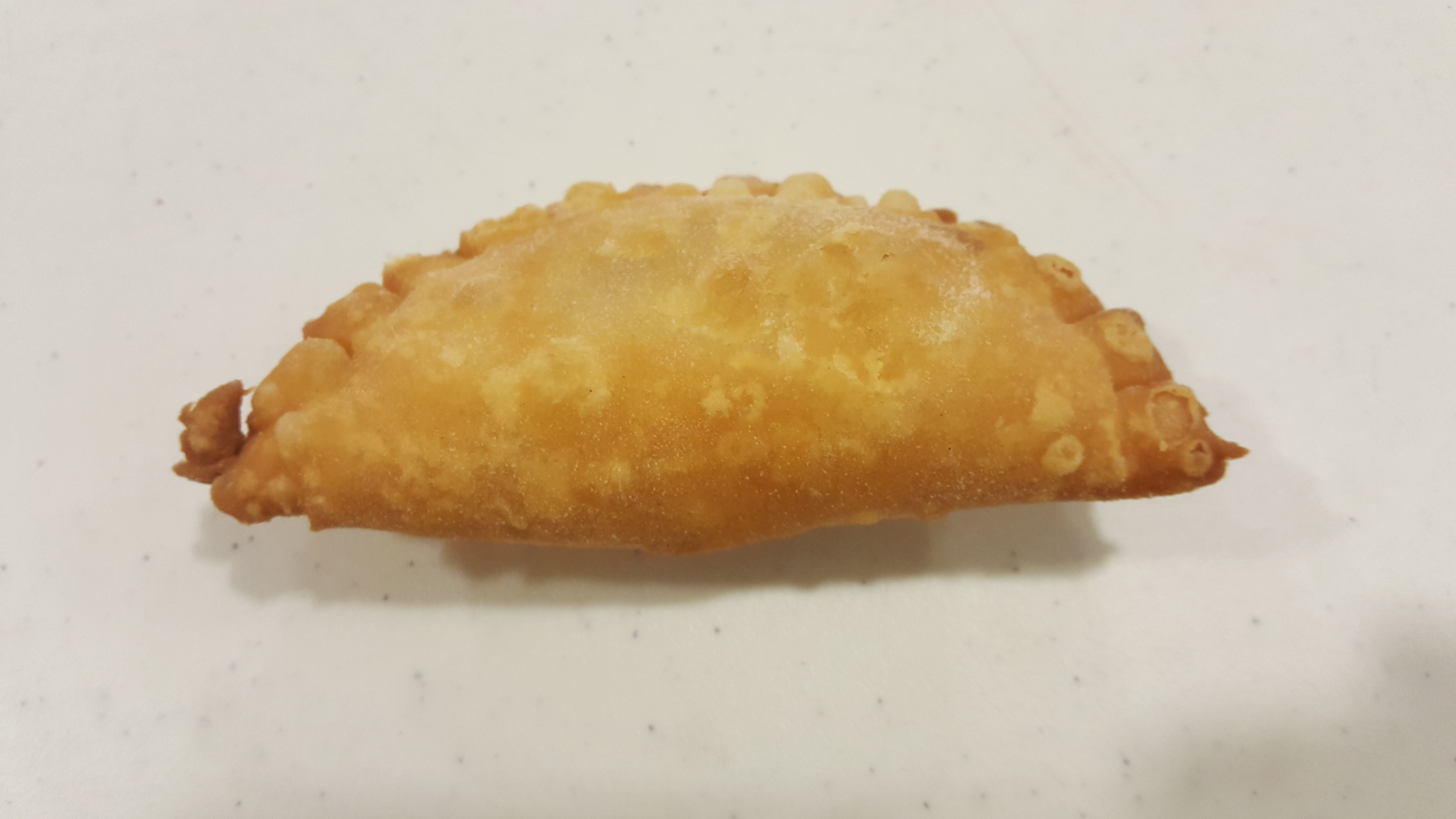
- Pastechi
- Course: Breakfast, snack
- Place of origin: Aruba, Bonaire and Curaçao
- Main ingredients: Dough (flour, salt, sugar, water, butter, egg), filling (meat, fish, vegetables, or cheese) combined with onions, green peppers, celery stalks, raisins, cumin, nutmeg, and/or hot peppers
- Variations: Numerous

Pastechi is a traditional breakfast or snack found throughout the ABC islands that is a crescent-shaped deep-fried dough with a filling. It is similar to an empanada. The dough tends to be slightly sweet. The filling widely varies and can include meat, seafood, vegetables, or cheese. The filling can also be combined with other ingredients such as onions, peppers, celery stalks, raisins, cumin, and nutmeg. Leftover meats, often roast chicken or pork, can be used for the recipe.

The dish is found throughout Aruba, Bonaire and Curaçao particularly at roadside snack bars or bakeries. However, even some top-rated restaurants on the island serve the dish. The dish is often served at parties as well and tend to be smaller than the ones that are purchased, with the party size approximately 10 centimeters in diameter.

The pastechi reflects the diverse ethnic and culinary influences in Aruba, such as from Indonesia and the Netherlands. For instance, the dish can utilize sambal olek or Indonesian chili paste.
