= List of Aruba international footballers =

The following notable players have played for the Aruba national football team, either as a member of the starting eleven or as a substitute. Each player's details include his playing position while with the team, the number of caps earned (appearances) and goals scored in all international matches, and their debut and most recent match year. The names are initially ordered by number of caps (in descending order), then by alphabetical order.

== Key ==
Positions key
Pre-1960s		1960s–	
GK	Goalkeeper		
FB	Full back	DF	Defender
HB	Half back	MF	Midfielder
FW	Forward		

Position
Playing positions are listed according to the tactical formations that were employed at the time. Thus the change in the names of defensive and midfield positions reflects the tactical evolution that occurred from the 1960s onwards.
Caps and goals
Caps and goals comprise those in the FIFA World Cup and UEFA European Championship, their associated qualification matches, as well as UEFA Nations League matches and international friendly tournaments and matches.

== Players ==
Notable players by caps, as of 30 August 2021
Player	Pos.	Caps	Goals	Debut year	Last played year	Ref.
Eric Abdul	GK	31	0	2011	Present	
Erik Santos de Gouveia	MF	27	3	2011	Present	
Theric Ruiz	DF	24	1	2004	2016	
Francois Croes	DF	23	0	2008	Present	
Nickenson Paul	DF	21	0	2014	Present	
Raymond Baten	MF	19	2	2011	2019	
Leroy Oehlers	DF	19	5	2013	2019	
Ronald Gómez	DF / FW	17	4	2002	Present	
Gregor Breinburg	MF	15	2	2015	Present	
Annuar Kock	MF	14	3	2011	2019	
Terence Groothusen	FW	11	4	2019	Present	
Rensy Barradas	FW	11	4	2011	2015	
Marlon Pereira Freire	DF	11	0	2018	Present	
Reinhard Breinburg	DF	10	0	2011	2014	
Glenbert Croes	FW	10	1	2018	Present	
Maurice Escalona	FW	10	4	2004	2015	
Josh Gross	MF	10	1	2018	Present	
Roman Aparicio	DF	9	0	2000	2016	
Walter Bennett	MF	9	0	2018	Present	
Jelano Cruden	FW	9	1	2008	2015	
Noah Harms	DF	9	1	2019	Present	
Javier Jiménez	MF	8	1	2019	Present	
Joshua John	MF	8	5	2018	Present	
Jonathan Ruiz	MF	8	0	2015	Present	
Jean-Luc Bergen	MF	7	2	2011	2018	
Sylvester Schwengle	MF	6	0	2008	2013	
Erixon Danso	MF	6	2	2015	2019	
Ikel Lopez	DF	6	0	2000	2012	
Mark Mackay	MF	6	2	2000	2004	
Gino Mulder	MF	6	0	2015	2018	
Ryan Tromp	GK	6	0	1995	2002	
Wander Gross	MF	6	4	2000	2001	
David Abdul	FW	5	1	2011	2015	
Kenrick Bradshaw	MF	5	0	1996	2000	
Ricangel de Leça	DF	5	0	2010	2012	
Matthew Lentink	GK	5	0	2015	2019	
Fernando Lewis	DF	5	0	2021	Present	
Darryl Bäly	DF	4	0	2021	Present	
Lesley Felomina	MF	4	3	2000	2001	
Jackson Gross	DF	4	0	1996	2000	
Rodney Lake	MF	4	0	2002	2008	
Diederick Luydens	DF	4	0	2021	Present	
Dwight Oehlers	DF	4	0	2015	2016	
Geoland Pantophlet	GK	4	0	1996	2004	
Raymondt Pimienta	MF	4	0	2002	2008	
Juan Rasmijn	FW	4	0	1996	2000	
George da Silva	FW	4	0	2000	2000	
Jeffrey Werleman	GK	4	0	2008	2010	
Gerald Zimmermann	MF	4	0	1996	2000	
Randell Harrevelt	FW	3	0	2019	2019	
Juan Valdez	DF	3	0	2004	2011	
Germain Cabrera	MF	2	0	2004	2004	
Eldrick Celaire	DF	2	0	2004	2004	
Germain Dirksz	FW	2	0	2000	2000	
Denzel Dumfries	DF	2	1	2014	2014	
Daniel Escalona	DF	2	0	2004	2004	
Andy Figaroa	DF	2	0	2004	2008	
Juan Geerman	DF	2	0	1996	1996	
Michel Lopez	MF	2	0	2000	2000	
Clayon Maduro	MF	2	0	2008	2008	
Jesus Paesch	DF	2	0	2008	2010	
Jonathan Richard	MF	2	0	2021	Present	
Lionel Tromp	FW	2	0	2008	2010	
Jean-Marc Antersijn	GK	1	0	2014	2014	
Derek Brison	FW	1	0	2004	2004	
Rubio Connor	DF	1	0	2004	2004	
Edre Elskamp	MF	1	0	2002	2002	
Antonio Giel	GK	1	0	2008	2008	
Roderick Lampe	FW	1	0	2004	2004	
Emile Linkers	FW	1	1	2014	2014	
Claudio Poppen	FW	1	0	2002	2002	
Enrique Zschuschen	FW	1	0	2004	2004	
