= Index of Aruba-related articles =

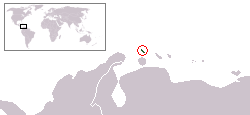
The location of the nation of Aruba

The following is an alphabetical list of topics related to the nation of Aruba.

== 0–9 ==
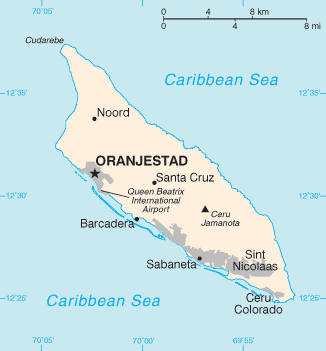
A map of Aruba

- .aw – Internet country code top-level domain for Aruba
- 1977 Aruba general strike (part of Aruba's political battle for autonomy)

== A ==
- Airports in Aruba
- Americas
  - North America
    - North Atlantic Ocean
      - West Indies
        - Caraïbische Zee (Caribbean Sea)
          - Antillen (Antilles)
            - Kleine Antillen (Lesser Antilles)
              - Islands of Aruba
- Antilles
- Aruba
- Aruba at the Olympics
  - Aruba at the 2004 Summer Olympics
- Aruba Dushi Tera
- Atlas of Aruba

== B ==
- Bibliography of Aruba

== C ==
- Capital of Aruba: Oranjestad
- Caribbean
- Caribbean Community (CARICOM)
- Caribbean Sea
- Categories:
  - Category:Aruba
    - Category:Aruba stubs
    - Category:Aruban people
    - Category:Aruba-related lists
    - Category:Buildings and structures in Aruba
    - Category:Communications in Aruba
    - Category:Culture of Aruba
    - Category:Economy of Aruba
    - Category:Environment of Aruba
    - Category:Geography of Aruba
    - Category:Government of Aruba
    - Category:Health in Aruba
    - Category:History of Aruba
    - Category:Politics of Aruba
    - Category:Society of Aruba
    - Category:Sport in Aruba
    - Category:Transport in Aruba
  - commons:Category:Aruba
- Cities of Aruba
- Coast guard – Dutch Caribbean Coast Guard
- Coat of arms of Aruba
- Communications in Aruba
- Constitution of Aruba
- Culture of Aruba

== D ==
- Demographics of Aruba
- Diario Newspaper
- Divi-divi
- Druif Beach
- Dutch colonization of the Americas
- Dutch language

== E ==
- Economy of Aruba
- Education in Aruba
- Elections in Aruba

== F ==
The Flag of Aruba

- Flag of Aruba

== G ==
- Geography of Aruba
- Government of Aruba
- Gross domestic product

== H ==
- History of Aruba

== I ==
- International Organization for Standardization (ISO)
  - ISO 3166-1 alpha-2 country code for Aruba: AW
  - ISO 3166-1 alpha-3 country code for Aruba: ABW
- Internet in Aruba
- Islands of Aruba:
  - Aruba
  - Indiaanskop
  - Key Cay
  - Long Cay
  - Ronde Island

== J ==
Juwana Morto

== K ==
- Kingdom of the Netherlands (Koninkrijk der Nederlanden)

== L ==
- Languages of Aruba
- Leeward Antilles
- Lesser Antilles
- LGBT rights in Aruba
- Lists related to Aruba:
  - List of airports in Aruba
  - List of Aruba-related topics
  - List of cities in Aruba
  - List of countries by GDP (nominal)
  - List of islands of Aruba
  - List of mammals of Aruba
  - List of political parties in Aruba
  - List of rivers of Aruba

== M ==
- Mammals of Aruba
- Jossy Mansur
- Military of Aruba
- Music of Aruba

== N ==
- Northern Hemisphere

== O ==
- Oranjestad – Capital of Aruba
- Outline of Aruba

== P ==
- Papiamento language
- Politics of Aruba
  - List of political parties in Aruba
- Prime Minister of Aruba

== Q ==
- Queen Beatrix International Airport

== R ==
- Rivers of Aruba

== S ==
- Scouting in Aruba
- South America

== T ==
- Transportation in Aruba

== V ==
- Visa policy of the Kingdom of the Netherlands in the Caribbean

== W ==
- West Indies
- Western Hemisphere
- Wikimedia Atlas of Aruba

== Z ==
- Gerald Zimmermann
- Enrique Zschuschen

== See also ==
- List of Caribbean-related topics
- List of international rankings
- Lists of country-related topics
- Outline of Aruba
