= Outline of Aruba =

Dutch Caribbean island country

The Flag of Aruba

The Coat of arms of Aruba

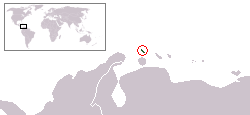
The location of Aruba

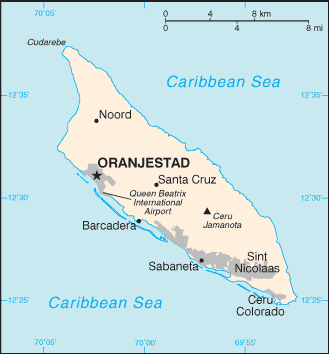
An enlargeable map of Aruba of the Kingdom of the Netherlands

The following outline is provided as an overview of and introduction to Aruba:

Aruba, officially the Country of Aruba, is a constituent island country within the Kingdom of the Netherlands, in the southern Caribbean Sea 29 kilometres (18 mi) north of the Venezuelan peninsula of Paraguaná and 80 kilometres (50 mi) northwest of Curaçao. In 1986, Aruba became a constituent country within the Kingdom of the Netherlands and acquired the formal name the Country of Aruba.

== General reference ==
- Pronunciation:
- Common English country name: Aruba
- Official English country name: Aruba of the Kingdom of the Netherlands
- Common endonym(s):
- Official endonym(s):
- Adjectival(s): Aruban
- Demonym(s):
- ISO country codes: AW, ABW, 533
- ISO region codes: See ISO 3166-2:AW
- Internet country code top-level domain: .aw

== Geography of Aruba ==
Geography of Aruba

- Aruba is: an island, and a country of the Kingdom of the Netherlands
- Location:
  - Northern Hemisphere and Western Hemisphere
    - North America (just off the coast of South America, north of Venezuela)
  - Atlantic Ocean
    - Caribbean
      - Antilles
        - Lesser Antilles (island chain)
          - Leeward Antilles
  - Time zone: Eastern Caribbean Time (UTC-04)
    - High: Mount Jamanota 188 m (617 ft)
    - Low: Caribbean Sea 0 m
  - Land boundaries: none
  - Coastline: 68.5 km
- Population of Aruba: 104,494 (2007) - 195th most populous country
- Area of Aruba: 193 square kilometres (75 sq mi)
- Atlas of Aruba

=== Environment of Aruba ===
- Climate of Aruba
- Wildlife of Aruba
  - Fauna of Aruba
    - Mammals of Aruba

==== Natural geographic features of Aruba ====
- Islands of Aruba
- Rivers of Aruba
- World Heritage Sites in Aruba: None

=== Regions of Aruba ===
==== Administrative divisions of Aruba ====
None.

=== Demography of Aruba ===
Demographics of Aruba

== Government and politics of Aruba ==
Politics of Aruba

- Form of government: constitutional monarchy and parliamentary representative democracy
- Capital of Aruba: Oranjestad
- Elections in Aruba
- Political parties in Aruba

=== Branches of government ===
Government of Aruba

==== Executive branch of the government of Aruba ====
- Head of state: Monarchy of the Netherlands
  - Her Majesty's representative: Governor of Aruba
- Head of government: Prime Minister of Aruba
- Cabinet: Council of Ministers of Aruba

==== Legislative branch of the government of Aruba ====
- Parliament: Estates of Aruba (unicameral)

==== Judicial branch of the government of Aruba ====
Court system of Aruba

- Court of first instance of Aruba

=== Foreign relations of Aruba ===
Foreign relations of Aruba

- Diplomatic missions in Aruba
- Diplomatic missions of Aruba

==== International organization membership ====
Aruba is a member of:

- Caribbean Community and Common Market (Caricom) (observer)
- International Criminal Police Organization (Interpol)
- International Labour Organization (ILO)
- International Monetary Fund (IMF)
- International Olympic Committee (IOC)
- International Trade Union Confederation (ITUC)
- United Nations Educational, Scientific, and Cultural Organization (UNESCO) (associate)
- Universal Postal Union (UPU)
- World Confederation of Labour (WCL)
- World Federation of Trade Unions (WFTU)
- World Meteorological Organization (WMO)
- World Tourism Organization (UNWTO) (associate)

In many other organizations (most notably the United Nations) the Kingdom of the Netherlands is a member acceding on behalf of all countries of the Kingdom.

=== Law and order in Aruba ===
- Capital punishment in Aruba
- Coast guard – Dutch Caribbean Coast Guard
- Constitution of Aruba
- Human rights in Aruba
  - LGBT rights in Aruba
- Law enforcement in Aruba

=== Military of Aruba ===
Military of Aruba

- Aruba is a protectorate of the Kingdom of the Netherlands, and has no defense forces of its own
- Forces
  - Army of Aruba: None
  - Navy of Aruba: None
  - Air Force of Aruba: None
  - Special forces of Aruba: None
- Military ranks of Aruba: None

== History of Aruba ==
History of Aruba

== Culture of Aruba ==
Culture of Aruba

- Festivals in Aruba
- Languages of Aruba
- National symbols of Aruba
  - Coat of arms of Aruba
  - Flag of Aruba
  - National anthem of Aruba
- Religion in Aruba
  - Islam in Aruba
- World Heritage Sites in Aruba: None
- National Library of Aruba
- List of monuments of Aruba

=== Art in Aruba ===
- Music of Aruba

=== Sports in Aruba ===
- Football in Aruba
- Aruba at the Olympics

== Economy and infrastructure of Aruba ==
Economy of Aruba

- Economic rank, by nominal GDP (2007): 154th (one hundred and fifty fourth)
- Communications in Aruba
  - Internet in Aruba
- Currency of Aruba: Florin
  - ISO 4217: AWG
- Aruba Stock Exchange
- Transport in Aruba
  - Airports in Aruba
  - Rail transport in Aruba

== Education in Aruba ==
- Colegio Arubano
- International School of Aruba

== See also ==
Aruba

- Index of Aruba-related articles
- List of international rankings
- Outline of geography
- Outline of North America
- Outline of South America
- Outline of the Caribbean
- Outline of the Netherlands
