= Oranjestad West =

Oranjestad West Orañestat West (Papiamento) Oranjestad Oeste (Spanish) Oranjestad-West (Dutch)
- Kingdom: Netherlands
- Country: Aruba

Area
  - Total: 929 ha (2,300 acres)

Population (2010)
  - Total: 13,976
  - Density: 1,500/km^{2} (3,900/sq mi)

Language spoken at home (2010)
  - Papiamento: 61.9%
  - Spanish: 22.3%
  - Dutch: 4.6%
  - English: 4.2%
  - Chinese: 2.4%
  - Other: 2.8%

Oranjestad West (Note: Papiamento: Orañestat West, colloquially Playa West; Spanish: Oranjestad Oeste; Dutch: Oranjestad-West) is one of the nine regions of the Caribbean island of Aruba, an autonomous country within the Kingdom of the Netherlands. It is located in Oranjestad, the capital city of Aruba.

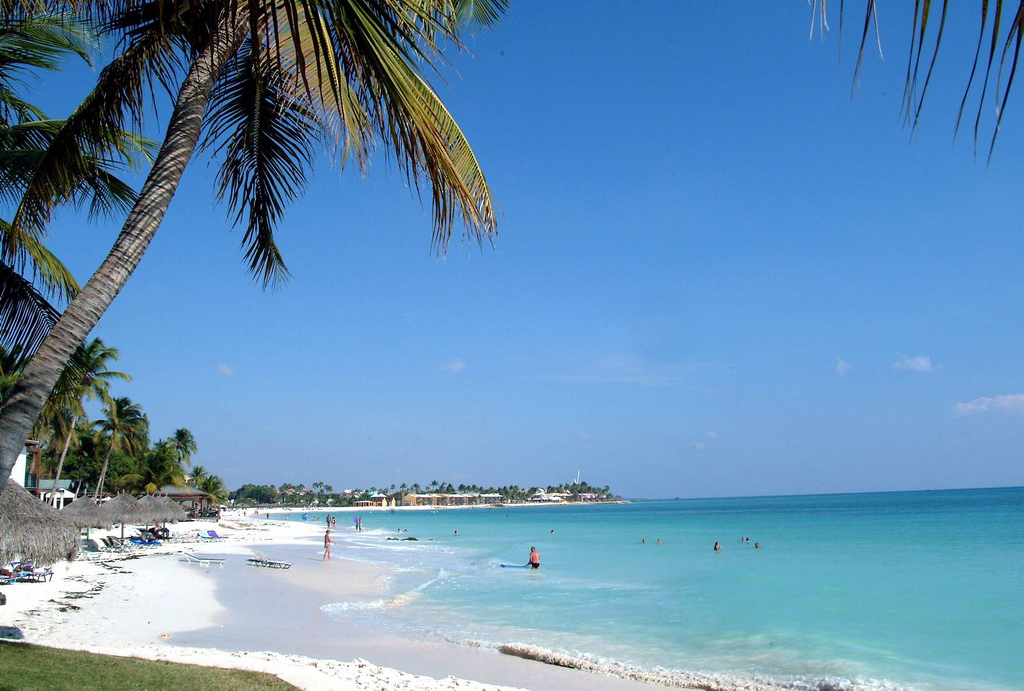
Eagle Beach, Aruba

== Geography ==
It is located northwest of the main island of Aruba, south of Region Noord (or northern region), west of Paradera and north of Oranjestad Oost.

Oranjestad West has an area of 9.29 square kilometers and a population of 13,976 people for the year 2010 which represents an increase from the year 2000 when it registered 12,131 people and the 1991 census when it had 8779.

== Tourism ==
=== Featured sites ===
- Eagle Beach
- Divi Beach
- Aruba Cruise Terminal
- Beach Tennis Aruba

== Demographics ==
As of the 2010 census, Oranjestad West had a population of 13,976. 53.34% of the population (7,455 residents) reported being female, while 46.67% (6,522) reported being male.

Oranjestad West has a high immigrant population. In 2010, 56.08% of the population (7,831 residents) reported being born in Aruba, while 43.92% (6,133) reported being born overseas. Most of these immigrants are from Latin America, with Spanish being the second-most spoken language at home in the region (spoken by 22.35% of residents).

=== Languages ===
Languages most spoken at home in Oranjestad West (2010)
Language	Speakers	%
Papiamento	8,638	61.81%
Spanish	3,123	22.35%
Dutch	646	4.62%
English	588	4.21%
Chinese	342	2.45%
Other languages	395	2.83%
Does not speak (yet)	196	1.40%
Not reported	49	0.35%
