= W.A.K.O. World Championships (Lignano Sabbiadoro) 2009 =

Kickboxing event in Italy

W.A.K.O. World Championships 2009 (Lignano Sabbiadoro)
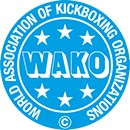
- The poster for W.A.K.O. World Championships 2009 (Lignano Sabbiadoro)
- Promotion: W.A.K.O.
- Date: November 24; November 29, 2009
- City: Lignano Sabbiadoro, Italy

The WAKO World Championships 2009 for Semi Contact (SC), Full Contact (FC), Musical Forms (MF) and Aero Kickboxing (Aero) were held in Lignano Sabbiadoro, Italy, from November 24 to November 29, 2009, under the organization of the World Association of Kickboxing Organizations (WAKO).

== Disciplines ==
=== Semi Contact (SC) ===
A point-based fighting system where speed, timing, and controlled techniques are emphasized. Matches are frequently stopped and restarted after scoring exchanges.

=== Full Contact (FC) ===
A traditional combat discipline where athletes fight continuously using punches and kicks with full power, aiming to win by points or knockout.

=== Musical Forms (MF) ===
A non-combat discipline where athletes perform choreographed martial arts routines, either with or without weapons, judged on technique, creativity, and presentation.

=== Aero Kickboxing (Aero) ===
A fitness-based competitive discipline combining martial arts movements with music, focusing on rhythm, endurance, and synchronization.

== Semi Contact ==
=== Men ===
| Event | Gold | Silver | Bronze |
|---|---|---|---|
| -57 kg | Manuel Esposito; Italy | Lewis Morrison; Great Britain | Ilshat Ahmadulin; Russia |
| -57 kg | Manuel Esposito; Italy | Lewis Morrison; Great Britain | Alex Veres; Hungary |
| -63 kg | Richard Veres; Hungary | Andrea Lucchese; Italy | Bartosz Baczynski; Poland |
| -63 kg | Richard Veres; Hungary | Andrea Lucchese; Italy | Jason Doyle; Ireland |
| -69 kg | Laszlo Gombos; Hungary | Domenico De Marco; Italy | Gebhart Michael; Austria |
| -69 kg | Laszlo Gombos; Hungary | Domenico De Marco; Italy | Jay Daniels; Ireland |
| -74 kg | Gregorio Di Leo; Italy | Mark McDermott; Ireland | Tamas Imre; Hungary |
| -74 kg | Gregorio Di Leo; Italy | Mark McDermott; Ireland | Nick Memmos; Greece |
| -79 kg | Zsolt Moradi; Hungary | Harald Schmidt; Germany | Robbie McMenamy; Ireland |
| -79 kg | Zsolt Moradi; Hungary | Harald Schmidt; Germany | Neri Stella; Italy |
| -84 kg | Kristian Jaroszkievicz; Hungary | Michael Page; Great Britain | Andreas Aggelopoulos; Greece |
| -84 kg | Kristian Jaroszkievicz; Hungary | Michael Page; Great Britain | Roman Bründl; Austria |
| -89 kg | Drew Neill; Great Britain | Marko Desa; Croatia | Gaulis Dimitri; Switzerland |
| -89 kg | Drew Neill; Great Britain | Marko Desa; Croatia | Zoltan Dancso; Hungary |
| -94 kg | Pero Gazilj; Croatia | Peter Csikos; Hungary | Rene Perz; Germany |
| -94 kg | Pero Gazilj; Croatia | Peter Csikos; Hungary | Michael Simmons; United States |
| +94 kg | Boris Miskovic; Croatia | Stephen Kerapf; United States | Gunther Wohlwende; Liechtenstein |
| +94 kg | Boris Miskovic; Croatia | Stephen Kerapf; United States | Ranis Smajlovic; Slovenia |
| Team | Hungary; Hungary | Italy; Italy | Great Britain; Great Britain |
| Team | Hungary; Hungary | Italy; Italy | Ireland; Ireland |

=== Women ===
| Event | Gold | Silver | Bronze |
|---|---|---|---|
| -50 kg | Giulia Cavallaro; Italy | Kim Tamara Samonte; Germany | Sinead Beasley; Ireland |
| -50 kg | Giulia Cavallaro; Italy | Kim Tamara Samonte; Germany | Dominika Ziemnicka; Poland |
| -55 kg | Eirin Dale; Norway | Luisa Gullotti; Italy | Bianca Pfahringer; Austria |
| -55 kg | Eirin Dale; Norway | Luisa Gullotti; Italy | Kateryna Solovey; Ukraine |
| -60 kg | Gloria De Bei; Italy | Barbara Szendrei; Hungary | Myriam Bourdala; Greece |
| -60 kg | Gloria De Bei; Italy | Barbara Szendrei; Hungary | Ida Abrahamsen; Norway |
| -65 kg | Bev Stuzaker; Great Britain | Georgia Prasinou; Greece | Chiara Leonardi; Italy |
| -65 kg | Bev Stuzaker; Great Britain | Georgia Prasinou; Greece | Melanie Moder; Germany |
| -70 kg | Anna Kondar; Hungary | Claire Louise Sweetman; Ireland | Jem Campbell; Great Britain |
| -70 kg | Anna Kondar; Hungary | Claire Louise Sweetman; Ireland | Marie-Eve Dicare; Canada |
| +70 kg | Mieke Hinke; Great Britain | Zsofia Minda; Hungary | Patrizia Berlingieri; Switzerland |
| +70 kg | Mieke Hinke; Great Britain | Zsofia Minda; Hungary | Natalie Cassidy; Ireland |

== Full Contact ==
=== Men ===
| Event | Gold | Silver | Bronze |
|---|---|---|---|
| -51 kg | Viatcheslav Kanaev; Russia | Ivan Sciolla; Italy | Wojciech Peryt; Poland |
| -51 kg | Viatcheslav Kanaev; Russia | Ivan Sciolla; Italy | Sebastien Plantier; France |
| -54 kg | Ilnaz Saifulin; Russia | Emil Karimov; Azerbaijan | Artem Skobchenko; Ukraine |
| -54 kg | Ilnaz Saifulin; Russia | Emil Karimov; Azerbaijan | Ridvan Kurt; Turkey |
| -57 kg | Alexander Shamrai; Russia | Damian Kaljniczak; Poland | Adem Güler; Turkey |
| -57 kg | Alexander Shamrai; Russia | Damian Kaljniczak; Poland | Chingskan Tlemissov; Kazakhstan |
| -60 kg | Eduard Mammadov; Azerbaijan | Zurab Faroyan; Russia | Søren Jorgensen; Denmark |
| -60 kg | Eduard Mammadov; Azerbaijan | Zurab Faroyan; Russia | Kevin Escanez; New Caledonia |
| -63.5 kg | Zalimkhan Aliev; Russia | Kostyantyn Demoretskyy; Ukraine | Mardan Buzdaev; Kazakhstan |
| -63.5 kg | Zalimkhan Aliev; Russia | Kostyantyn Demoretskyy; Ukraine | Gabor Gorbics; Hungary |
| -67 kg | Oleg Zaytsev; Russia | Edmond Mebenga; New Caledonia | Jarkko Jussila; Finland |
| -67 kg | Oleg Zaytsev; Russia | Edmond Mebenga; New Caledonia | Samat Kadyrbekov; Kazakhstan |
| -71 kg | Nikolay Osobskiy; Ukraine | Christian Kvatningen; Norway | Eduard Spakov; Lithuania |
| -71 kg | Nikolay Osobskiy; Ukraine | Christian Kvatningen; Norway | Sanjin Pol Vrgoc; Croatia |
| -75 kg | Andreas Lodrup; Norway | Azamat Nurpeisov; Kazakhstan | Yusup Magamedbekov; Russia |
| -75 kg | Andreas Lodrup; Norway | Azamat Nurpeisov; Kazakhstan | Rafael Kaiser; Brazil |
| -81 kg | Manuchar Pipiia; Russia | Michal Hromek; Slovakia | Ehram Majidov; Azerbaijan |
| -81 kg | Manuchar Pipiia; Russia | Michal Hromek; Slovakia | Igor Prykhodko; Ukraine |
| -86 kg | Sergey Bogdan; Russia | Bojan Miskovic; Croatia | David Nagode; Slovenia |
| -86 kg | Sergey Bogdan; Russia | Bojan Miskovic; Croatia | Mattia Bezzon; Italy |
| -91 kg | Alexey Tokarev; Russia | Denis Simkin; Ukraine | Ladislav Kacmarak; Slovakia |
| -91 kg | Alexey Tokarev; Russia | Denis Simkin; Ukraine | Sarkhan Jabbarov; Azerbaijan |
| +91 kg | Jukka Saarinen; Finland | Hamza Kendircioglu; Turkey | Jacek Puchacz; Poland |
| +91 kg | Jukka Saarinen; Finland | Hamza Kendircioglu; Turkey | Damon Jeremie; France |

=== Women ===
| Event | Gold | Silver | Bronze |
|---|---|---|---|
| -48 kg | Valeria Calabrese; Italy | Vira Makresova; Ukraine | McKenzie Wright; Canada |
| -48 kg | Valeria Calabrese; Italy | Vira Makresova; Ukraine | Irina Myakina; Russia |
| -52 kg | Sandra Drabik; Poland | Mette Solli; Norway | Yeliz Koblay; Turkey |
| -52 kg | Sandra Drabik; Poland | Mette Solli; Norway | Therese Gunnarsson; Sweden |
| -56 kg | Valeriya Iskhakova; Russia | Tonje Sorlie; Norway | Roxane Lasczak; France |
| -56 kg | Valeriya Iskhakova; Russia | Tonje Sorlie; Norway | Seda Duygu Aygün; Turkey |
| -60 kg | Thea Therese Naess; Norway | Gozde Bayeri Arican; Turkey | Severine Guilpin; France |
| -60 kg | Thea Therese Naess; Norway | Gozde Bayeri Arican; Turkey | Adriane Marksteiner; Germany |
| -65 kg | Julia Irmen; Germany | Nicole Trimmel; Austria | Svetlana Kulakova; Russia |
| -65 kg | Julia Irmen; Germany | Nicole Trimmel; Austria | Cathrine Fonnes; Norway |
| -70 kg | Olga Slavinskaya; Russia | Caroline Ek; Sweden | Nives Radic; Croatia |
| -70 kg | Olga Slavinskaya; Russia | Caroline Ek; Sweden | Birgit Oksnes; Norway |
| +70 kg | Anna Gladkikh; Russia | Karen Dews; Great Britain | |
| +70 kg | Anna Gladkikh; Russia | Karen Dews; Great Britain | Ana Bajic; Croatia |

== Musical Forms ==
=== Musical Forms (Hard Style Women) ===
| Event | Gold | Silver | Bronze |
|---|---|---|---|
| Hard Style | Elena Chirkova; Russia | Jessica Holmes; Great Britain | Anette Sexe; Norway |

== Semi Contact Veteran ==
=== Veteran Men ===
| Event | Gold | Silver | Bronze |
|---|---|---|---|
| -63 kg | Daz Ellis; Great Britain | Lusine Jean Petiqen; France | |
| -63 kg | Daz Ellis; Great Britain | Lusine Jean Petiqen; France | Parzer Günther; Austria |
| -69 kg | Piotr Siegoczynski; Poland | Jochen Paulfranz; Germany | Chris Collymore; Great Britain |
| -69 kg | Piotr Siegoczynski; Poland | Jochen Paulfranz; Germany | Slavko Majkic; Slovenia |
| -74 kg | Stephane Dube; Canada | Gareth McLaughlin; Ireland | |
| -79 kg | Billie Bryce; Great Britain | Giovanni Sgrilletti; Germany | Rasoa Narisoa Max; France |
| -79 kg | Billie Bryce; Great Britain | Giovanni Sgrilletti; Germany | Danny Griffith; Canada |
| -84 kg | Andreas Reim; Germany | Anthony Arangs; United States | |
| -84 kg | Andreas Reim; Germany | Anthony Arangs; United States | Gerald Zimmermann; Austria |
| -89 kg | Peter Edwards; Great Britain | Jeff Batts; United States | Sendor Roman; Austria |
| -89 kg | Peter Edwards; Great Britain | Jeff Batts; United States | Frank Feuer; Germany |
| -94 kg | Christopher Rappold; United States | Weingerl Manfred; Austria | Martin Bannon; Ireland |
| -94 kg | Christopher Rappold; United States | Weingerl Manfred; Austria | Schalk Labuschagne; South Africa |
| +94 kg | Clifton Findley; Great Britain | Paul Coffey; Ireland | Wojciech Gorecki; Poland |
| +94 kg | Clifton Findley; Great Britain | Paul Coffey; Ireland | Dennis Molloy; United States |

=== Veteran Women ===
| Event | Gold | Silver | Bronze |
|---|---|---|---|
| +70 kg | Michelle Curtis; Ireland | Trixie Dumas; United States | |
