= Pimenta =

Pimenta may refer to:

- Pimenta (surname), a Portuguese surname
- Pimenta (genus), a genus of plants that includes allspice
- Pimenta, Minas Gerais, a Brazilian municipality
- Pimenta Bueno, Rondônia, a Brazilian municipality
- Chocolate com Pimenta, a Brazilian telenovela
- Pimenta's Point, an anatomical landmark
- Rani Chennabhairadevi, a 16th-century Indian Queen nicknamed "Queen Pimenta" by the Portuguese

== See also ==
- Pimienta (disambiguation)
- Pimental, surname
- Pimentel (disambiguation)
- Pimento (disambiguation)
