= 2024 Little League World Series results =

Children's baseball competition results

The results of the 2024 Little League World Series were determined between August 14 and August 25, 2024, in South Williamsport, Pennsylvania. Twenty teams were divided into two groups, one with ten teams from the United States and another with ten international teams, with both groups playing a modified double-elimination tournament. In each group, the last remaining undefeated team faced the last remaining team with one loss, with the winners of those games advancing to play for the Little League World Series championship. Florida, the United States champions, defeated Chinese Taipei, the international champions, 2–1 in 8 innings to win the 2024 championship.

Double-elimination
United States
United States	Winner's bracket								
United States	(New Hampshire) NH 1 (Hawaii) HI 3◄ Linescore	(Florida) FL 2◄ (South Dakota) SD 1 Linescore	(New York (state)) NY 1 (Nevada) NV 9◄ Linescore	(Texas) TX 9◄ (Pennsylvania) PA 0 Linescore	(Illinois) IL 0 (Hawaii) HI 5◄ Linescore	(Florida) FL 6◄ (Washington (state)) WA 1 Linescore	(Nevada) NV 3◄ (Hawaii) HI 2 Linescore	(Florida) FL 1 (Texas) TX 4◄ Linescore	(Nevada) NV 2 (Texas) TX 5◄ Linescore
United States	Loser's bracket								
United States	(South Dakota) SD 3 (New York (state)) NY 6◄ Linescore	(Pennsylvania) PA 5◄ (New Hampshire) NH 0 Linescore	(Illinois) IL 0 (New York (state)) NY 4◄ Linescore	(Washington (state)) WA 2 (F/4) (Pennsylvania) PA 12◄ Linescore	(Pennsylvania) PA 1 (Hawaii) HI 3◄ Linescore	(Florida) FL 6◄ (New York (state)) NY 1 Linescore	(Florida) FL 4◄ (Hawaii) HI 3 Linescore	(Florida) FL 6◄ (Nevada) NV 3 Linescore	
International
International	Winner's bracket								
International	(Aruba) ARU 0 (Mexico) MEX 2◄ Linescore	(Chinese Taipei) TPE 8◄ (Canada) CAN 0 Linescore	(Japan) JPN 11◄ (Puerto Rico) PUR 0 (F/4); Linescore	(Cuba) CUB 4◄ (Czech Republic) CZE 1 Linescore	(Venezuela) VEN 10◄ (Mexico) MEX 0 (F/4); Linescore	(Chinese Taipei) TPE 11◄ (Australia) AUS 0 (F/5); Linescore	(Japan) JPN 2◄ (Venezuela) VEN 1 Linescore	(Chinese Taipei) TPE 10◄ (Cuba) CUB 2 Linescore	(Chinese Taipei) TPE 3◄ (Japan) JPN 1 Linescore
International	Loser's bracket								
International	(Canada) CAN 12◄ (Puerto Rico) PUR 5 Linescore	(Czech Republic) CZE 3 (Aruba) ARU 8◄ Linescore	(Mexico) MEX 8◄ (Canada) CAN 0 Linescore	(Australia) AUS 0 (F/4) (Aruba) ARU 11◄ Linescore	(Aruba) ARU 1 (Venezuela) VEN 2◄ Linescore	(Cuba) CUB 4 (Mexico) MEX 6◄ Linescore	(Venezuela) VEN 11◄ (Mexico) MEX 3 Linescore	(Venezuela) VEN 3◄ (Japan) JPN 2 Linescore	
Single-elimination
International championship	Chinese Taipei 4◄ Venezuela 1 Linescore								
United States championship	Florida 10◄ Texas 7 Linescore								
Third place game	Texas 3 Venezuela 4◄ Linescore								
World championship game	Chinese Taipei 1 (F/8); Florida 2◄ Linescore								

== Double-elimination stage ==
=== United States ===
Upper round 1	Upper round 2	Upper round 3	Upper final	Final
August 16 – Game 10
August 14 – Game 2	Illinois	0
August 19 – Game 22
New Hampshire	1	Hawaii	5
Hawaii	2
Hawaii	3	August 15 – Game 6
Nevada	3
(New York (state)) New York	1
August 21 – Game 30
Nevada	9
Nevada	2
August 16 – Game 12
Texas	5
August 14 – Game 4	(Washington (state)) Washington	1
August 19 – Game 24
Florida	2	Florida	6
Florida	1
South Dakota	1	August 15 – Game 8
Texas	4
Texas	9	August 24 – U.S. Championship
Pennsylvania	0	Texas	7
Florida	10
Lower round 1	Lower round 2	Lower round 3	Lower round 4	Lower final
August 20 – Game 28
August 18 – Game 17	Florida	6	August 22 – Game 34
August 17 – Game 14	Illinois	0	New York	1	August 21 – Game 32	Nevada	3
South Dakota	3	New York	4	Florida	4	Florida	6
New York	6	August 20 – Game 26	Hawaii	3
August 18 – Game 19 (F/4)	Hawaii	3
August 17 – Game 16	Washington	2	Pennsylvania	1
Pennsylvania	5	Pennsylvania	12
New Hampshire	0

==== Winner's bracket ====
===== Game 2: Hawaii 3, New Hampshire 1 =====
August 14 3:00 pm EDT Howard J. Lamade Stadium
Team	1	2	3	4	5	6	R	H	E
New Hampshire	0	0	0	0	1	0	1	1	1
Hawaii ◄	3	0	0	0	0	X	3	6	1
WP: Evan Tavares (1–0) LP: Colton Johnson (0–1) Sv: Brextyn Hong (1); Boxscore

===== Game 4: Florida 2, South Dakota 1 =====
August 14 7:00 pm EDT Howard J. Lamade Stadium
Team	1	2	3	4	5	6	R	H	E
Florida ◄	0	0	0	0	2	0	2	8	1
South Dakota	0	0	0	1	0	0	1	2	0
WP: James Feliciano (1–0) LP: Ryan Henry (0–1) Sv: Luis Calo (1); Boxscore

===== Game 6: Nevada 9, New York 1 =====
August 15 3:00 pm EDT Howard J. Lamade Stadium
Team	1	2	3	4	5	6	R	H	E
New York	0	0	0	1	0	0	1	5	1
Nevada ◄	0	0	3	1	5	X	9	11	2
WP: Wyatt Erickson (1–0) LP: Stephen Grippo (0–1); Boxscore

===== Game 8: Texas 9, Pennsylvania 0 =====
August 15 7:00 pm EDT Howard J. Lamade Stadium
Team	1	2	3	4	5	6	R	H	E
Texas ◄	0	1	1	1	6	0	9	12	1
Pennsylvania	0	0	0	0	0	0	0	2	1
WP: Julian Hurst (1–0) LP: Saverio Longo (0–1); Home runs: TX: Caden Guffey (1), Doc Mogford (1), Kole Newson (1); PA: None; Boxscore

===== Game 10: Hawaii 5, Illinois 0 =====
August 16 3:00 pm EDT Howard J. Lamade Stadium
Team	1	2	3	4	5	6	R	H	E
Illinois	0	0	0	0	0	0	0	3	1
Hawaii ◄	1	0	3	0	1	X	5	3	0
WP: Evan Tavares (2–0) LP: Dillon Phelan (0–1); Boxscore

===== Game 12: Florida 6, Washington 1 =====
August 16 7:00 pm EDT Howard J. Lamade Stadium
Team	1	2	3	4	5	6	R	H	E
Florida ◄	0	1	2	2	0	1	6	4	1
Washington	0	0	1	0	0	0	1	2	4
WP: Luis Calo (1–0) LP: Brayden Blair (0–1); Home runs: FL: James Feliciano (1); WA: None; Boxscore

===== Game 22: Nevada 3, Hawaii 2 =====
August 19 3:00 pm EDT Howard J. Lamade Stadium
Team	1	2	3	4	5	6	R	H	E
Nevada ◄	0	1	0	0	1	1	3	5	1
Hawaii	0	0	0	1	1	0	2	9	2
WP: Gunnar Gaudin (1–0) LP: Gauge Pacheco (0–1); Boxscore

===== Game 24: Texas 4, Florida 1 =====
August 19 7:00 pm EDT Howard J. Lamade Stadium
Team	1	2	3	4	5	6	R	H	E
Florida	1	0	0	0	0	0	1	3	0
Texas ◄	1	0	3	0	0	X	4	3	0
WP: Julian Hurst (2–0) LP: James Feliciano (1–1); Boxscore

===== Game 30: Texas 5, Nevada 2 =====
August 21 3:00 pm EDT Howard J. Lamade Stadium
Team	1	2	3	4	5	6	R	H	E
Nevada	0	2	0	0	0	0	2	5	1
Texas ◄	2	0	3	0	0	X	5	8	0
WP: Cooper Hastings (1–0) LP: Wyatt Erickson (1–1); Boxscore

==== Loser's bracket ====
===== Game 14: New York 6, South Dakota 3 =====
August 17 3:00 pm EDT Howard J. Lamade Stadium
Team	1	2	3	4	5	6	R	H	E
South Dakota	0	0	0	1	1	1	3	3	0
New York ◄	0	0	0	4	2	X	6	11	0
WP: Jake Romero (1–0) LP: Griff Sommer (0–1); Notes: South Dakota is eliminated. Boxscore

===== Game 16: Pennsylvania 5, New Hampshire 0 =====
August 17 7:00 pm EDT Howard J. Lamade Stadium
Team	1	2	3	4	5	6	R	H	E
Pennsylvania ◄	0	0	1	4	0	0	5	6	0
New Hampshire	0	0	0	0	0	0	0	2	3
WP: Tyler Neeld (1–0) LP: Nolan Dupuis (0–1); Notes: New Hampshire is eliminated. Boxscore

===== Game 17: New York 4, Illinois 0 =====
August 18 9:00 am EDT Howard J. Lamade Stadium
Team	1	2	3	4	5	6	R	H	E
Illinois	0	0	0	0	0	0	0	3	1
New York ◄	0	0	0	4	0	X	4	9	0
WP: Vincent Ruggiero (1–0) LP: Alex Vivanco (0–1); Notes: Illinois is eliminated. Boxscore

===== Game 19: Pennsylvania 12, Washington 2 =====
August 18 1:00 pm EDT Howard J. Lamade Stadium
Team	1	2	3	4	5	6	R	H	E
Washington	0	1	1	0	–	–	2	1	2
Pennsylvania ◄	4	2	6	X	–	–	12	9	1
WP: Saverio Longo (1–1) LP: Easton Stolmeier (0–1); Notes: Completed early due to the run rule. Washington is eliminated. Boxscore

===== Game 26: Hawaii 3, Pennsylvania 1 =====
August 20 3:00 pm EDT Howard J. Lamade Stadium
Team	1	2	3	4	5	6	R	H	E
Pennsylvania	0	0	0	0	0	1	1	4	2
Hawaii ◄	2	0	0	0	1	X	3	6	0
WP: Evan Tavares (3–0) LP: Brayden Peiffer (0–1) Sv: Kanon Nakama (1); Notes: Pennsylvania is eliminated. Boxscore

===== Game 28: Florida 6, New York 1 =====
August 20 7:00 pm EDT Howard J. Lamade Stadium
Team	1	2	3	4	5	6	R	H	E
Florida ◄	0	0	1	0	1	4	6	5	1
New York	0	0	0	1	0	0	1	5	1
WP: Lathan Norton (1–0) LP: Alex Torres (0–1); Home runs: FL: DeMarcos Mieses (1); NY: None; Notes: New York is eliminated. Boxscore

===== Game 32: Florida 4, Hawaii 3 =====
August 21 7:00 pm EDT Howard J. Lamade Stadium
Team	1	2	3	4	5	6	R	H	E
Florida ◄	1	2	1	0	0	0	4	6	1
Hawaii	0	0	0	3	0	0	3	6	1
WP: Jacob Bibaud (1–0) LP: Kamalei Leynes-Santos (0–1) Sv: Luis Calo (2); Home runs: FL: Garrett Rohozen (1); HI: None; Notes: Hawaii is eliminated. Boxscore

===== Game 34: Florida 6, Nevada 3 =====
August 22 7:00 pm EDT Howard J. Lamade Stadium
Team	1	2	3	4	5	6	R	H	E
Florida ◄	4	0	1	0	0	1	6	8	1
Nevada	3	0	0	0	0	0	3	7	0
WP: Teraj Alexander (1–0) LP: Russell McGee (0–1); Home runs: FL: James Feliciano (2), Garrett Rohozen (2); NV: None; Notes: Nevada is eliminated. Boxscore

=== International ===
Upper round 1	Upper round 2	Upper round 3	Upper final	Final
August 16 – Game 9 (F/4)
August 14 – Game 1	Venezuela	10
August 19 – Game 21
Aruba	0	Mexico	0
Venezuela	1
Mexico	2	August 15 – Game 5 (F/4)
Japan	2
Japan	11
August 21 – Game 29
Puerto Rico	0
Japan	1
August 16 – Game 11 (F/5)
Chinese Taipei	3
August 14 – Game 3	Australia	0
August 19 – Game 23
Chinese Taipei	8	Chinese Taipei	11
Chinese Taipei	10
Canada	0	August 15 – Game 7
Cuba	2
Cuba	4	August 24 – Int'l Championship
Czech Republic	1	Chinese Taipei	4
Venezuela	1
Lower round 1	Lower round 2	Lower round 3	Lower round 4	Lower final
August 20 – Game 27
August 18 – Game 18	Cuba	4	August 22 – Game 33
August 17 – Game 13	Mexico	8	Mexico	6	August 21 – Game 31	Japan	2
Canada	12	Canada	0	Mexico	3	Venezuela	3
Puerto Rico	5	August 20 – Game 25	Venezuela	11
August 18 – Game 20 (F/4)	Venezuela	2
August 17 – Game 15	Australia	0	Aruba	1
Czech Republic	3	Aruba	11
Aruba	8

==== Winner's bracket ====
===== Game 1: Mexico 2, Aruba 0 =====
August 14 1:00 pm EDT Volunteer Stadium
Team	1	2	3	4	5	6	R	H	E
Aruba	0	0	0	0	0	0	0	0	2
Mexico ◄	0	1	0	1	0	X	2	2	0
WP: Antonio Guerrero (1–0) LP: Naivmar Angela (0–1) Sv: Raul Hernandez Jr (1); Boxscore

===== Game 3: Chinese Taipei 8, Canada 0 =====
August 14 5:00 pm EDT Volunteer Stadium
Team	1	2	3	4	5	6	R	H	E
Chinese Taipei ◄	0	0	5	0	3	0	8	5	1
Canada	0	0	0	0	0	0	0	0	1
WP: Lai Cheng-Xi (1–0) LP: Ben Wegwitz (0–1); Boxscore

===== Game 5: Japan 11, Puerto Rico 0 =====
August 15 1:00 pm EDT Volunteer Stadium
Team	1	2	3	4	5	6	R	H	E
Japan ◄	5	0	6	0	–	–	11	6	1
Puerto Rico	0	0	0	0	–	–	0	1	4
WP: Kanta Iwashita (1–0) LP: Fernando Santos (0–1); Home runs: JPN: Kanta Iwashita (1); PUR: None; Notes: Completed early due to the run rule. Boxscore

===== Game 7: Cuba 4, Czech Republic 1 =====
August 15 5:00 pm EDT Volunteer Stadium
Team	1	2	3	4	5	6	R	H	E
Cuba ◄	0	0	0	0	2	2	4	4	0
Czech Republic	1	0	0	0	0	0	1	2	1
WP: Deivy Hernandez (1–0) LP: Illia Kolomoiets (0–1) Sv: Yans Espinosa (1); Boxscore

===== Game 9: Venezuela 10, Mexico 0 =====
August 16 1:00 pm EDT Volunteer Stadium
Team	1	2	3	4	5	6	R	H	E
Venezuela ◄	4	0	5	1	–	–	10	10	2
Mexico	0	0	0	0	–	–	0	1	0
WP: Luis Yepez (1–0) LP: Dominic Balderas (0–1); Home runs: VEN: Jhonson Freitez (1); MEX: None; Notes: Completed early due to the run rule. Boxscore

===== Game 11: Chinese Taipei 11, Australia 0 =====
August 16 5:00 pm EDT Volunteer Stadium
Team	1	2	3	4	5	6	R	H	E
Chinese Taipei ◄	6	0	2	0	3	–	11	9	0
Australia	0	0	0	0	0	–	0	1	1
WP: Lin Sheng-Kai (1–0) LP: Sayre Howick (0–1); Notes: Completed early due to the run rule. Boxscore

===== Game 21: Japan 2, Venezuela 1 =====
August 19 1:00 pm EDT Volunteer Stadium
Team	1	2	3	4	5	6	R	H	E
Japan ◄	0	1	0	0	1	0	2	4	1
Venezuela	0	0	1	0	0	0	1	6	0
WP: Kanta Iwashita (2–0) LP: Willian's Mora (0–1) Sv: Yuki Tsuji (1); Boxscore

===== Game 23: Chinese Taipei 10, Cuba 2 =====
August 19 5:00 pm EDT Volunteer Stadium
Team	1	2	3	4	5	6	R	H	E
Chinese Taipei ◄	0	0	0	1	4	5	10	9	2
Cuba	2	0	0	0	0	0	2	4	1
WP: Lai Cheng-Xi (2–0) LP: Denis Zamora (0–1); Home runs: TPE: Chiu Wei-Che (1); CUB: None; Boxscore

===== Game 29: Chinese Taipei 3, Japan 1 =====
August 21 1:00 pm EDT Volunteer Stadium
Team	1	2	3	4	5	6	R	H	E
Chinese Taipei ◄	2	0	0	1	0	0	3	6	0
Japan	0	0	0	0	0	1	1	3	0
WP: Lai Cheng-Xi (3–0) LP: Yuki Tsuji (0–1) Sv: Lin Sheng-Kai (1); Boxscore

==== Loser's bracket ====
===== Game 13: Canada 12, Puerto Rico 5 =====
August 17 1:00 pm EDT Volunteer Stadium
Team	1	2	3	4	5	6	R	H	E
Canada ◄	0	12	0	0	0	0	12	10	0
Puerto Rico	3	0	0	2	0	0	5	5	3
WP: Ronan Bobiles (1–0) LP: Jonyel Cordero (0–1); Notes: Puerto Rico is eliminated. Boxscore

===== Game 15: Aruba 8, Czech Republic 3 =====
August 17 5:00 pm EDT Volunteer Stadium
Team	1	2	3	4	5	6	R	H	E
Czech Republic	0	0	0	3	0	0	3	5	3
Aruba ◄	2	1	5	0	0	X	8	10	0
WP: Henry Kransen (1–0) LP: Štěpán Švec (0–1); Notes: Czech Republic is eliminated. Boxscore

===== Game 18: Mexico 8, Canada 0 =====
August 18 11:00 am EDT Volunteer Stadium
Team	1	2	3	4	5	6	R	H	E
Mexico ◄	3	0	3	1	0	1	8	9	2
Canada	0	0	0	0	0	0	0	2	3
WP: Raul Hernandez Jr (1–0) LP: Blake Anderson (0–1); Notes: Canada is eliminated. Boxscore

===== Game 20: Aruba 11, Australia 0 =====
August 18 2:00 pm EDT Volunteer Stadium
Team	1	2	3	4	5	6	R	H	E
Australia	0	0	0	0	–	–	0	3	0
Aruba ◄	3	0	0	8	–	–	11	9	0
WP: Arnold Martha (1–0) LP: Ethan Cross (0–1); Home runs: AUS: None; ARU: Nishant Toledo (1); Notes: The game was suspended during the top of the 2nd inning due to inclement weather, and completed the following day. Completed early due to the run rule. Australia is eliminated. Boxscore

===== Game 25: Venezuela 2, Aruba 1 =====
August 20 1:00 pm EDT Volunteer Stadium
Team	1	2	3	4	5	6	R	H	E
Aruba	1	0	0	0	0	0	1	3	2
Venezuela ◄	0	0	0	0	0	2	2	6	0
WP: José Pérez (1–0) LP: Henry Kransen (1–1); Notes: Aruba is eliminated. Boxscore

===== Game 27: Mexico 6, Cuba 4 =====
August 20 5:00 pm EDT Volunteer Stadium
Team	1	2	3	4	5	6	R	H	E
Cuba	1	1	0	2	0	0	4	5	1
Mexico ◄	0	0	0	0	1	5	6	6	0
WP: Antonio Guerrero (2–0) LP: Denis Zamora (0–2); Home runs: CUB: None; MEX: Antonio Guerrero (1), Ulises Ortiz (1); Notes: Cuba is eliminated. Boxscore

===== Game 31: Venezuela 11, Mexico 3 =====
August 21 5:00 pm EDT Volunteer Stadium
Team	1	2	3	4	5	6	R	H	E
Venezuela ◄	3	3	1	0	0	4	11	9	0
Mexico	0	1	0	2	0	0	3	5	1
WP: Luis Yepez (2–0) LP: Raul Hernandez Jr (1–1); Notes: Mexico is eliminated. Boxscore

===== Game 33: Venezuela 3, Japan 2 =====
August 22 3:00 pm EDT Howard J. Lamade Stadium
Team	1	2	3	4	5	6	R	H	E
Venezuela ◄	0	0	0	3	0	0	3	4	0
Japan	0	0	0	2	0	0	2	3	1
WP: Diego Biarreta (1–0) LP: Taiyo Honryo (0–1) Sv: Jhonson Freitez (1); Notes: Japan is eliminated. Boxscore

== Single-elimination stage ==
=== International championship: Chinese Taipei 4, Venezuela 1 ===
August 24 12:30 pm EDT Howard J. Lamade Stadium
Team	1	2	3	4	5	6	R	H	E
Chinese Taipei ◄	1	0	2	0	1	0	4	3	1
Venezuela	0	0	0	0	0	1	1	3	1
WP: Lai Cheng-Xi (4–0) LP: Luis Yepez (2–1) Sv: Chiu Wei-Che (1); Notes: Venezuela is eliminated. Boxscore

=== United States championship: Florida 10, Texas 7 ===
August 24 3:30 pm EDT Howard J. Lamade Stadium
Team	1	2	3	4	5	6	R	H	E
Florida ◄	0	0	0	1	4	5	10	10	1
Texas	0	2	2	0	3	0	7	7	1
WP: Luis Calo (2–0) LP: Kaleb Christ (0–1); Notes: Texas is eliminated. Boxscore

=== Third place game: Venezuela 4, Texas 3 ===
August 25 10:00 am EDT Howard J. Lamade Stadium
Team	1	2	3	4	5	6	R	H	E
Texas	3	0	0	0	0	0	3	4	2
Venezuela ◄	0	2	2	0	0	X	4	7	2
WP: Willian Mora (1–1) LP: Caden Guffey (0–1) Sv: Samuel Carrasquel (1); Boxscore

=== World championship game: Florida 2, Chinese Taipei 1 ===
August 25 3:00 pm EDT Howard J. Lamade Stadium
Team	1	2	3	4	5	6	7	8	R	H	E
Chinese Taipei	1	0	0	0	0	0	0	0	1	5	2
Florida ◄	0	0	0	0	0	1	0	1	2	8	0
WP: Lathan Norton (2–0) LP: Chiu Wei-Che (0–1); Notes: Florida wins the Little League World Series. Boxscore
