= Trompf =

Trompf is a surname. Notable people with the surname include:

- Keirra Trompf (born 1985), Australian netball player
- Percy Trompf (1902–1964), Australian commercial artist

== See also ==
- Tromp (surname)
