= Tromp (surname) =

Tromp is a Dutch occupational surname thought to be derived from trompet(ter), trumpet (player), or sometimes trommelaar, drummer.

Tromp may also refer to:

== People with the surname ==
- Chadwick Tromp (born 1995), Aruban baseball player
- Cornelis Tromp (1629–1691), Dutch admiral, son of Maarten Tromp
- Esra Tromp (born 1990), Dutch racing cyclist
- Felipe Tromp (1917–1995), first Governor of Aruba
- Frederik Cornelis Tromp (1828–1900), Dutch politician and minister
- Gerrit Tromp (1901–1938), Dutch rower
- Gretha Tromp (born 1964), Dutch sprinter and hurdler
- Henricus Tromp (1878–1962), Dutch rower
- Herman Tromp (1874–1953), Dutch association football referee
- Johann Tromp (born 1990), Namibian rugby union player
- John Tromp, Dutch computer scientist
- Lionel Tromp (born 1984), Aruban footballer
- Maarten Tromp (1598–1653), Dutch admiral
- Marlene Tromp, American academic administrator
- Nadia Tromp (born 1977), South African architect
- Nicolaas Cornelius Tromp (born 1973), Namibian Civil consulting engineer
- Ruud Tromp (born 1954), Dutch-born American semiconductor physicist
- Ryan Tromp (born 1973), Aruban footballer
- Sebastiaan Tromp (1889–1975), Dutch Jesuit priest, theologian, and Latinist
- Solco Walle Tromp (1909–1983), Dutch geologist and biometeorologist
- Theodoor Philibert Tromp (1903–1984), Dutch politician and engineer

== See also ==
- Tromp (disambiguation)
- Trump (surname)
