= Pimienta =

Pimienta is a Spanish word, meaning "pepper". It may refer to:

- Pimienta, Honduras, a municipality in the Cortés department
- rana pimienta ("pepper frog"), a local name of the frog Leptodactylus labyrinthicus
- Pimienta (film), a 1966 Argentine film

== People ==
- Bernardo Gómez-Pimienta (born 1961), Mexican architect and furniture designer
- Francisco Díaz Pimienta (1594–1652), Spanish naval officer
- Francisco Javier García Pimienta (born 1974), Spanish retired football player and football manager
- Juan de Torrezar Díaz Pimienta (died 1782), Spanish military officer and colonial official
- Lido Pimienta (born 1986), Colombian-Canadian musician
- Pavel Pimienta (born 1976), volleyball player from Cuba
- Raymondt Pimienta (born 1982), Aruban football player

== See also ==
- Pimenta (disambiguation)
