= Pimento (disambiguation) =

Pimiento is a type of chili pepper.

Pimiento or Pimento may also refer to:

- Pimento, Indiana, United States, an unincorporated town
- "Pimento" (Better Call Saul), an episode of Better Call Saul
- Adrian Pimento, a character in Brooklyn Nine-Nine
- Jamaican term for allspice
- Pimenta (genus), a genus of flowering plants sometimes called wild pimento
- Carlos Pimiento (born 1968), Colombian retired footballer
- Mauricio Pimiento (born 1961), Colombian politician
- Pimento cheese, a cheddar based cheese which contains Pimiento peppers
- Pimento loaf, a type of luncheon meat

== See also ==
- Pimenta (disambiguation)
- Pimentón, Spanish for paprika
- "Pimemento" (Brooklyn Nine-Nine episode)
