= Pimental =

Pimental is a surname. Notable people with the surname include:

- Brian Pimental (born 1964), American storyboard artist, director and screenwriter
- Edward Pimental, American soldier
- José Vizcaíno Pimental, Dominican baseball player
- Nancy Pimental (born 1965), American actress and writer

== See also ==
- Pimenta (disambiguation)
- Pimentel (disambiguation)
