= Pimentel =

·Pimentel may refer to:

== Localities ==
- Mariana Pimentel, municipality in Rio Grande do Sul, Brazil
- Mendes Pimentel, municipality in Minas Gerais, Brazil
- Pimentel, Dominican Republic, city in the Duarte province
- Pimentel, Sardinia, municipality in Cagliari, Italy
- Pimentel District, in Chiclayo, Peru

== People ==
- Pimentel (surname), including notable individuals with this name

== Other ==
- George C. Pimentel Award in Chemical Education
- Palacio de Pimentel, royal palace in Castile and León

== See also ==
- Pimental, a surname
- Pimenta (disambiguation)
