= Tromp =

Tromp may refer to:

- Tromp (surname), a Dutch occupational surname
- HNLMS Tromp, several ships of the Royal Netherlands Navy named after the admirals
  - Tromp-class cruiser, named after the first of these ships
  - Tromp-class frigate, two frigates
- TROMP, a biennial percussion competition and music festival and competition in Eindhoven, Netherlands
- Trompowsky Attack, a chess opening

== See also ==
- Trompe, a hydropowered pump which produces pressurised air
- Trump (disambiguation)
