= Laura Wernet-Paskel =

Aruban teacher, writer and politician

Laura Simona Wernet-Paskel (February 18, 1911 – September 8, 1962) was an Aruban teacher, writer, and politician. She was the first female political candidate in Aruba, running for office three times beginning in 1949.

== Early life and education ==
Laura Simona Paskel was born in Santa Cruz, Aruba, in 1911. She was the oldest of three children in a Catholic farming family. On the advice of the Dominican nuns who oversaw Catholic education in Aruba, she went by boat to the Netherlands at age 15 to study at a school in Reuver. When Paskel, along with Magdalena de Cuba, passed the teacher's exam in 1931, the two became the first Aruban schoolteachers to graduate in the Netherlands.

== Career ==
=== Teaching ===
Back in Aruba, Paskel began teaching at the Maria School in Santa Cruz, where she was known as "Miss Laura." But she was fired in 1937 after her marriage to Willem Wernet, as was customary for married women working in the public sector at the time. In the early years of their marriage, she took over the administration of her husband's businesses. She also gave birth to seven children between 1938 and 1949.

She began working as a teacher again in 1948, but only on a contract basis. She taught at the Maria School as well as other local schools, including Filomena College in San Nicolaas.

=== Writer ===
After initially being forced to stop teaching, Wernet-Paskel dedicated herself to literature, setting up her own library at home and lending out books because there was no public library on the island. She began to write poetry and short stories.

In 1944 she completed the 80-page handwritten manuscript "Ons eilandje Aruba" ("Our Island Aruba"), becoming the first woman to produce a written history of the island. The manuscript, written in Dutch, provides a description of Aruba's population, its early history, its growth and development in the 1940s, and its flora and fauna. It was published in part during World War II in the magazine Maandblad voor de Jeugd, but it was not published in full until 1992, when it was released posthumously as a standalone book.

=== Politics ===
Wernet-Paskel became politically active through community organizing, running campaigns for the hungry in the Netherlands during the war years, particularly during the Dutch famine of 1944–45. In 1953, she gathered relief funds for victims of the North Sea flood in Zeeland.

In 1948, the National Aruban Union (UNA) party was formed, and Wernet-Paskel, who was by then a well-known figure in the Roman Catholic community, joined. Universal suffrage was introduced to the Netherlands Antilles that year, which allowed women to vote in the next elections on March 17, 1949. Wernet-Paskel stood for election that year, becoming the first female candidate in the history of Aruba.

Ahead of the election, she was chosen for fifth place on the UNA party list with 594 votes; Felipe Tromp was chosen as party leader. However, she failed to obtain a state seat.

After a split in the party, Wernet-Paskel allied with UNA-II, the Catholic branch led by Apolonio (Poy) Werleman. She ran again in the state elections on December 21, 1950, and then in the first elections for the Island Council following its establishment through the Islands Regulation of the Netherlands Antilles (ERNA) in 1951. She never received enough personal votes to take office. Wernet-Paskel was the only female candidate in each of these three elections.

She continued to be politically active despite her electoral losses. She organized protests of housewives against prostitution in 1951, particularly in response to the proposed establishment of a brothel in Juwana Morto, which was to be modeled after the open-air Campo Alegre brothel in Curaçao.

Wernet-Paskel retired from politics in 1955. Aruba would not have a female lawmaker until Maria Irausquin-Wajcberg was elected in 1963.

== Death and legacy ==
Wernet-Paskel was diagnosed with cancer in 1957, and she resigned from teaching in the beginning of 1960. She died in 1962 at the Lago Colony hospital.

The Sint Jan primary school in Kadushi Largo was renamed Colegio Laura Wernet-Paskel in 1992. A stamp with her image was released in 1996, and in 1999 she was honored as "Woman of the Millenium" by various Aruban authorities.
