= Capital punishment in Aruba =

Capital punishment in Aruba has been prohibited by Article I.4 of the Constitution of Aruba since 1 January 1986, the day Aruba became a constituent country of the Kingdom of the Netherlands in its own right. The inclusion of a capital punishment prohibition in the constitution had followed the example provided by the 1983 constitution of the Netherlands, but rather than putting it in the judiciary section like the example, it was put in the basic rights, following the related Article I.3 about the inviolability of the body, to ensure that the prohibition would not be perceived as exclusively applying to judges.
