= List of cities in Aruba =

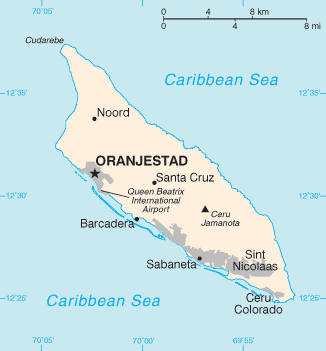
A map of Aruba, showing points of interest

The island of Aruba is one of the constituent countries of the Kingdom of the Netherlands in the southern Caribbean Sea. Aruba has no administrative subdivisions, but, for census purposes, is divided into six districts, each of which has many neighbourhoods within it. Many of these neighbourhoods have names, but are not considered by the Aruban government to be separate political or administrative entities. The capital of Aruba is the city of Oranjestad.

The following is a list of districts in the country of Aruba, with known neighbourhoods and villages listed beneath them.

== Districts ==
- Noord
  - Alto Vista
  - Bubali
  - Malmok
  - Moko
  - Palm Beach
  - Tanki Flip
  - Tanki Leendert
  - Washington
  - Westpunt
- Oranjestad (capital)
  - Barcadera
  - Companashi
  - Cumana
  - Cunucu Abao
  - Dakota
  - Eagle Beach
  - Kavel
  - Klip
  - Madiki
  - Mahuma
  - Mon Plaisir
  - Paardenbaai
  - Paradijswijk
  - Parkietenbos
  - Ponton
  - Potrero
  - Pos Abao
  - Rancho
  - Sabana Blanco
  - Santa Helena
  - Seroe Blanco
  - Simeon Antonio
  - Sividivi
  - Socotoro
  - Solito
  - Tarabana
- Paradera
  - Ayo
  - Piedra Plat
  - Shiribana
- San Nicolaas
  - Brasil
  - Esso Heights
  - Essoville
  - Juana Morto
  - Kustbatterij
  - Lago Colony
  - Rooi Congo
  - Rooi Hundo
  - Seroe Colorado
  - Standardville
  - Watapana Gezaag
  - Zeewijk
- Santa Cruz
  - Balashi
  - Cashero
  - Hooiberg
  - Macuarima
  - Papilon
  - Urataka
- Savaneta Rooi Koochi
  - Cura Cabai
  - De Bruynewijk
  - Jara
  - Pos Chiquito
  - Seroe Alejandro
