= Gino Mulder =

Aruban footballer (born 1987)

Personal information
- Date of birth: 9 October 1987 (age 39)
- Place of birth: The Hague, Netherlands
- Position: Midfielder

Senior career*
Years	Team	Apps	(Gls)
2006–2007	Haaglandia	21	(1)
2007–2010	Katwijk	38	(1)
2010–2014	De Jodan Boys	1	(1)
2014–2016	Quick		
2016–2019	HBS	23	(3)
2019–2023	Die Haghe		
Total		83+	(6+)

International career
2015–2018	Aruba	7	(0)
- * Club domestic league appearances and goals

Gino Mulder (born 9 October 1987) is an Aruban former professional footballer who played as a midfielder.

== Career ==
He has played club football for Haaglandia, Katwijk, De Jodan Boys, Quick Den Haag and HBS Craeyenhout.

He made his international debut for Aruba in 2015.
