= Juan Rasmijn =

Aruban footballer

Personal information
- Date of birth: February 8, 1981 (age 45)
- Position: Forward

International career
| Years | Team | Apps | (Gls) |
| 1996–2000 | Aruba | 3 | (0) |

Juan Rasmijn (born February 8, 1981) is an Aruban football player and former player for the Aruba national team. He debuted for the national team on March 11, 2000, at the age of 19, during a World Cup qualification match. Over his international career, he made two appearances for Aruba, wearing the number 9 jersey against other CONCACAF teams.
