= Jeffrey Werleman =

Aruban footballer

Personal information
- Full name: Jeffrey Werleman
- Date of birth: September 30, 1983 (age 43)
- Place of birth: Oranjestad, Aruba
- Height: 1.97 m (6 ft 6 in)

Team information
- Current team: La Fama
- Number: 1

Senior career*
Years	Team	Apps	(Gls)
2000–2003	Caravel		
2003–2005	SV Estrella		
2005–	La Fama		

International career
2010	Aruba	4	(0)
- * Club domestic league appearances and goals

Jeffrey Werleman is a football goalkeeper and former member of the Aruba national football team. His first club was Caravel.
