= Michel Lopez (Aruban footballer) =

Aruban footballer

Personal information
- Date of birth: November 3, 1972 (age 54)
- Position: Defensive midfielder

Team information
- Current team: SV Estrella
- Number: 17

International career
Years	Team	Apps	(Gls)
2000	Aruba	2	(0)

Michel Lopez (born November 3, 1972) is an Aruban footballer. He has played for the Aruba national team.
