= Telecommunications in Aruba =

This article is about communications systems in Aruba.

== Telephone ==
Telephones - main lines in use: 38,700 (2006)
country comparison to the world: 166

Telephones - mobile cellular: 105,700 (2006)
country comparison to the world: 178

Telephone system:
general assessment: modern fully automatic telecommunications system
domestic: increasing competition through privatization; 3 wireless service providers are now licensed
international: 1 submarine cable to Sint Maarten (Netherlands Antilles); extensive inter-island microwave radio relay links. Satellite connection with the rest of the world are also available.

== Radio ==
Radio broadcast stations: AM 2, FM 16, shortwave 0 (2004)

Radios: 50,000 (1997)

== Television ==
Television broadcast stations: 3 (2004)

Televisions: 60,000 (2004)

== Internet ==
Internet country code: AW

Internet Service Providers (ISPs): Setar NV

International Carriers: IP Globalcom N.V. (2008)

Internet hosts: 17,611 (2008)
country comparison to the world: 97

Internet users: 24,000 (2007)
country comparison to the world: 183

As of May 2007, the whole island of Aruba has 3G cellular internet connections.
