= Geoland Pantophlet =

Aruban footballer

Personal information
- Date of birth: June 14, 1976 (age 50)
- Position: Goalkeeper

International career
Years	Team	Apps	(Gls)
1996–2004	Aruba	4	(0)

Geoland Pantophlet (born June 14, 1976) is an Aruban football player. He played for the Aruba national team in 1996 and 2004.

== National team statistics ==
Aruba national team
Year	Apps	Goals
1996	2	0
2004	2	0
Total		
