= Pimenta (surname) =

Pimenta is a Portuguese surname (meaning pepper). People with the surname include:

- Adhemar Pimenta (1896-1970), Brazilian football manager
- Adriano Pimenta (born 1982), Brazilian footballer
- Edmilson Gonçalves Pimenta (born 1971), Brazilian footballer
- Emanuel Eduardo Pimenta Vieira Silva (born 1985), Portuguese sprinter
- Emanuel Dimas de Melo Pimenta (born 1957), artist
- Euclides Rodriguez Pimenta da Cunha (1866-1909), Brazilian journalist, sociologist and engineer
- Fernando Pimenta (born 1989), Portuguese sprint kayaker
- João Pimenta (born 1985), Portuguese football player
- José Pimenta (born 1899), footballer
- Joaquim Pimenta de Castro (1846-1918), Portuguese military officer and politician
- Leonardo André Pimenta Faria (born 1982), Brazilian footballer
- Rui Costa Pimenta (born 1957), Brazilian Communist politician
- Simon Pimenta (1920-2013), Roman Catholic Cardinal and Archbishop
