= George da Silva =

Aruban footballer

Personal information
- Date of birth: August 8, 1971 (age 55)
- Position: Forward

International career
Years	Team	Apps	(Gls)
2000	Aruba	4	(0)

George da Silva (born August 8, 1971) is an Aruban football player. In 2000, he played for the Aruba national team.
