= Indiaanskop =

Island of Aruba

Indiaans Kop
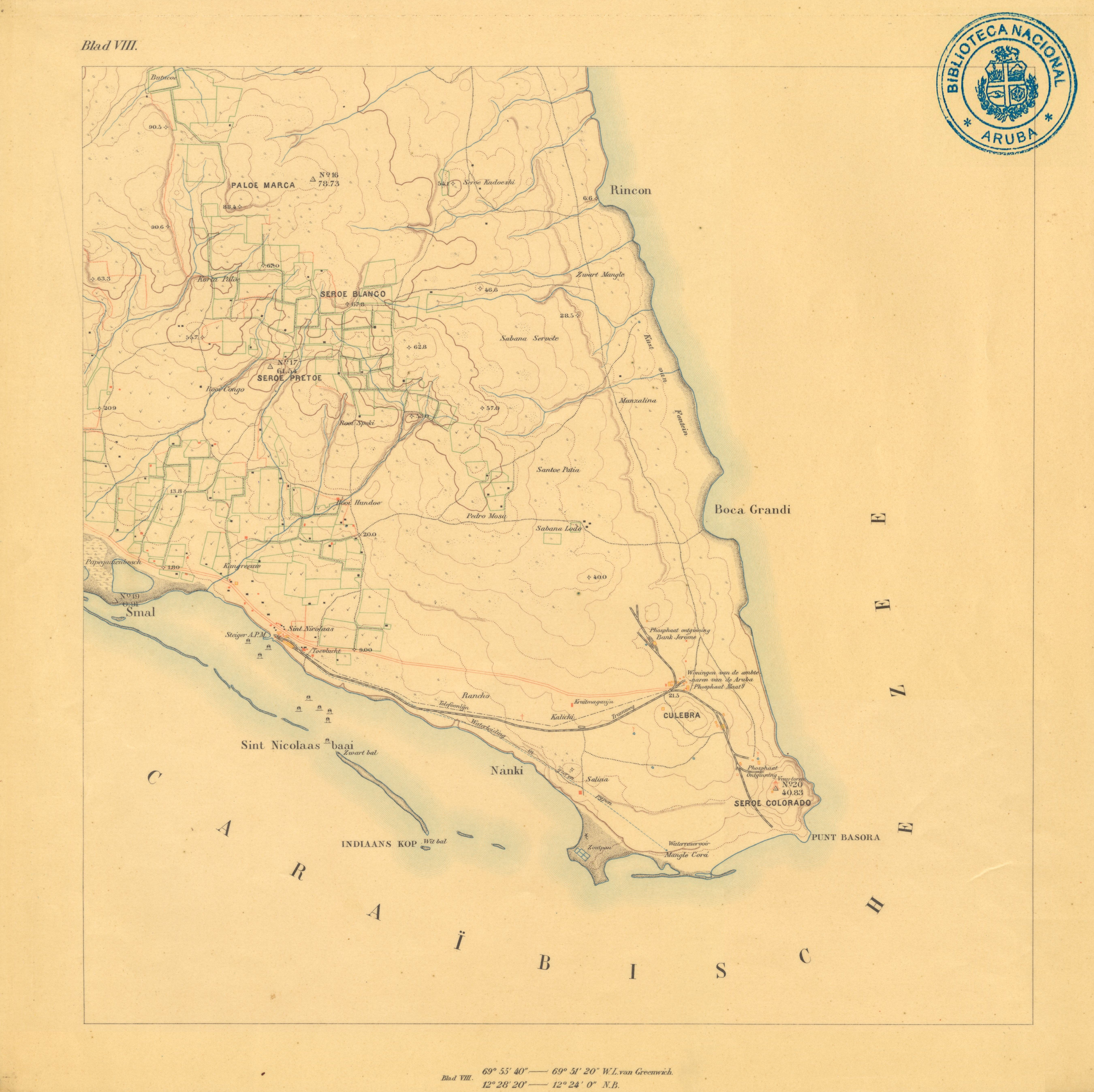
- Map of southern Aruba, Indiaanskop (bottom-left)

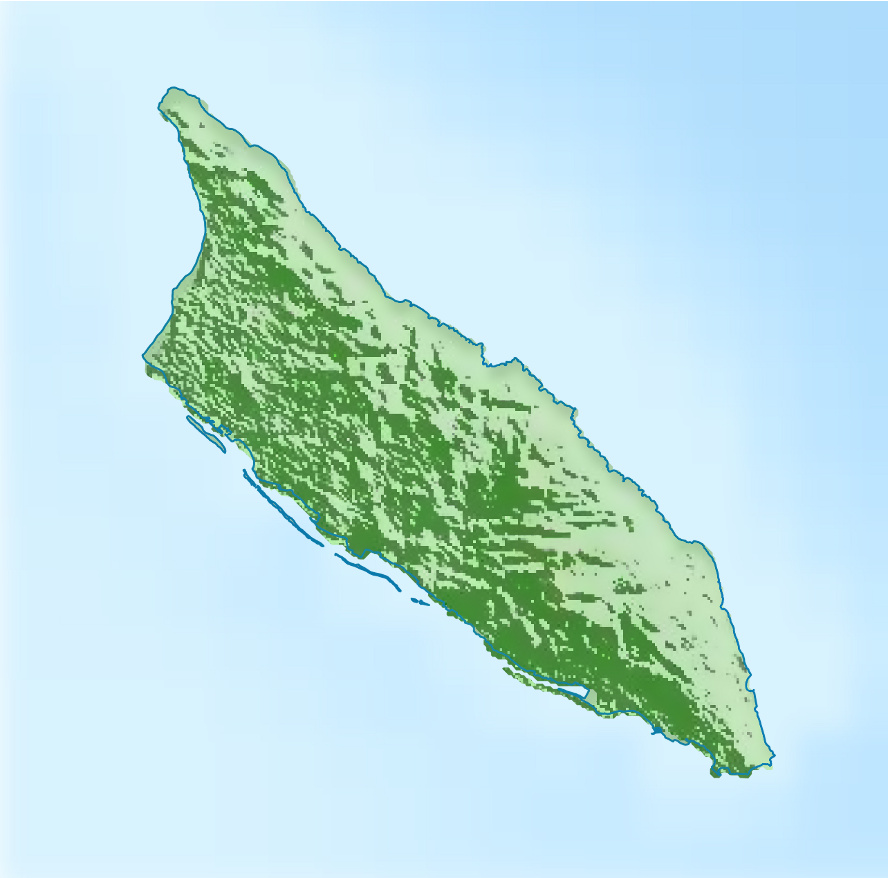
- Location within Aruba Location within Lesser Antilles Location within the Caribbean

Geography
- Location: Caribbean
- Coordinates: 12°24.8798′N 69°53.7700′W
- Archipelago: Leeward Islands, Lesser Antilles

Administration
- Aruba

Additional information
- Time zone: AST (UTC-4)

Indiaanskop, also known as Indian Head, is an island near Aruba. It was previously estimated to have a terrain elevation of 1 metre (3.3 ft) above sea level. In the 1950s, a number of ancient cannons were discovered on the seabed near the island.

In 1770, a Spanish pirate ship named St Charlos, led by skipper Mediasabel, stranded in the area. Presently, the island is partially submerged and is marked with a light.
