= Ikel Lopez =

Aruban footballer

Personal information
- Date of birth: February 16, 1979 (age 47)
- Position: Defender

Team information
- Current team: SV Estrella

International career
Years	Team	Apps	(Gls)
2000–2012	Aruba	6	(0)

Ikel Lopez (born February 16, 1979) is an Aruban footballer. He formerly played for the Aruba national team.

== National team statistics ==
Aruba national team
Year	Apps	Goals
2000	3	0
2004	1	0
2010	1	0
2012	1	0
Total	1	0
