= Clayon Maduro =

Aruban footballer

Personal information
- Date of birth: 5 March 1989 (age 37)
- Position: Midfielder

International career^{‡}
| Years | Team | Apps | (Gls) |
| 2008 | Aruba | 2 | (0) |
- ‡ National team caps and goals as of 01:49, 15 April 2011 (UTC)

Clayon Maduro (born 5 March 1989) is an Aruban international footballer who earned two caps for the national team in 2008.
