= Roman Aparicio =

Aruban footballer

Personal information
- Date of birth: December 3, 1980 (age 45)
- Place of birth: Oranjestad, Aruba
- Position: Defender

International career
Years	Team	Apps	(Gls)
2000–2016	Aruba	6	(0)

Roman Aparicio (born December 3, 1980) is an Aruban football player. He has appeared for the Aruba national team in 2000, 2002, 2011, and 2016.

== National team statistics ==
Aruba national team
Year	Apps	Goals
2000	1	0
2001	0	0
2002	1	0
2011	2	0
2016	2	0
Total	6	0
