= Sylvester Schwengle =

Aruban footballer (born 1988)

Personal information
- Full name: Sylvester Rudolf Junior Schwengle
- Date of birth: July 20, 1988 (age 38)
- Place of birth: Oranjestad, Aruba
- Height: 1.74 m (5 ft 8 1/2 in)
- Positions: Midfielder; striker

Team information
- Current team: La Fama
- Number: 7

Youth career
- La Fama

Senior career*
Years	Team	Apps	(Gls)
2007-2016	La Fama	60	(25)
2016-2017	Britannia	10	(4)
2017–2024	La Fama	85	(20)
Total		155	(49)

International career
2008	Aruba U20		
2010	Aruba U23		
2008–2014	Aruba	9	(0)
- * Club domestic league appearances and goals

Sylvester Schwengle (born 20 July 1988), known as Sylvester, is an Aruban former footballer who plays as a striker/attacking midfielder for Aruban Division di Honor club La Fama and a former member of the Aruba national football team. He has 9 caps for national team. His playing position is right wing.

== Honours ==
La Fama

- Aruban Division di Honor: 2012–13,
- Liga Honor Plata: 2022–23, 2023–24,
