= Andy Figaroa =

Aruban footballer

Personal information
- Date of birth: April 10, 1983 (age 43)
- Position: Defender

Team information
- Current team: SV Deportivo Nacional

International career
Years	Team	Apps	(Gls)
2004–2008	Aruba	2	(0)

Andy Figaroa (born April 10, 1983) is an Aruban football player. He has appeared for the Aruba national team twice in 2004 and 2008.

== National team statistics ==
Aruba national team
Year	Apps	Goals
2004	1	0
2008	1	0
Total	2	0
