= .aw =

Top-level Internet domain for Aruba

- Introduced: 20 February 1996
- TLD type: Country code top-level domain
- Status: Active
- Registry: SETAR
- Sponsor: SETAR
- Intended use: Entities connected with Aruba
- Actual use: Used mainly by companies based in Aruba, but there are not many registrations.
- Registration restrictions: Domains can only be registered in the name of a person running a one-man business or executing a profession, a partnership or a corporation, an association, a legal entity or an institution which is registered in Aruba.
- Structure: Registrations are directly at second level, or beneath .com.aw
- Documents: Rules and regulations
- Dispute policies: UDRP
- Registry website: Setarnet Domain Registrations

.aw is the Internet country code top-level domain (ccTLD) for Aruba. It is administered by SETAR.

== Second-level domains ==
Registrations are permitted directly at the second level, but there is also a .com.aw subdomain intended for commercial sites. Most of registrations are made via SETARNET's website.

There has also been an increase in .pro.aw registrations intended for Aruban professionals.

== See also ==
- Internet in Aruba
- Internet in the Netherlands
- .nl
- .sx
- .cw
