= SETAR NV =

- Industry: Telecommunications
- Subsidiaries: Telearuba

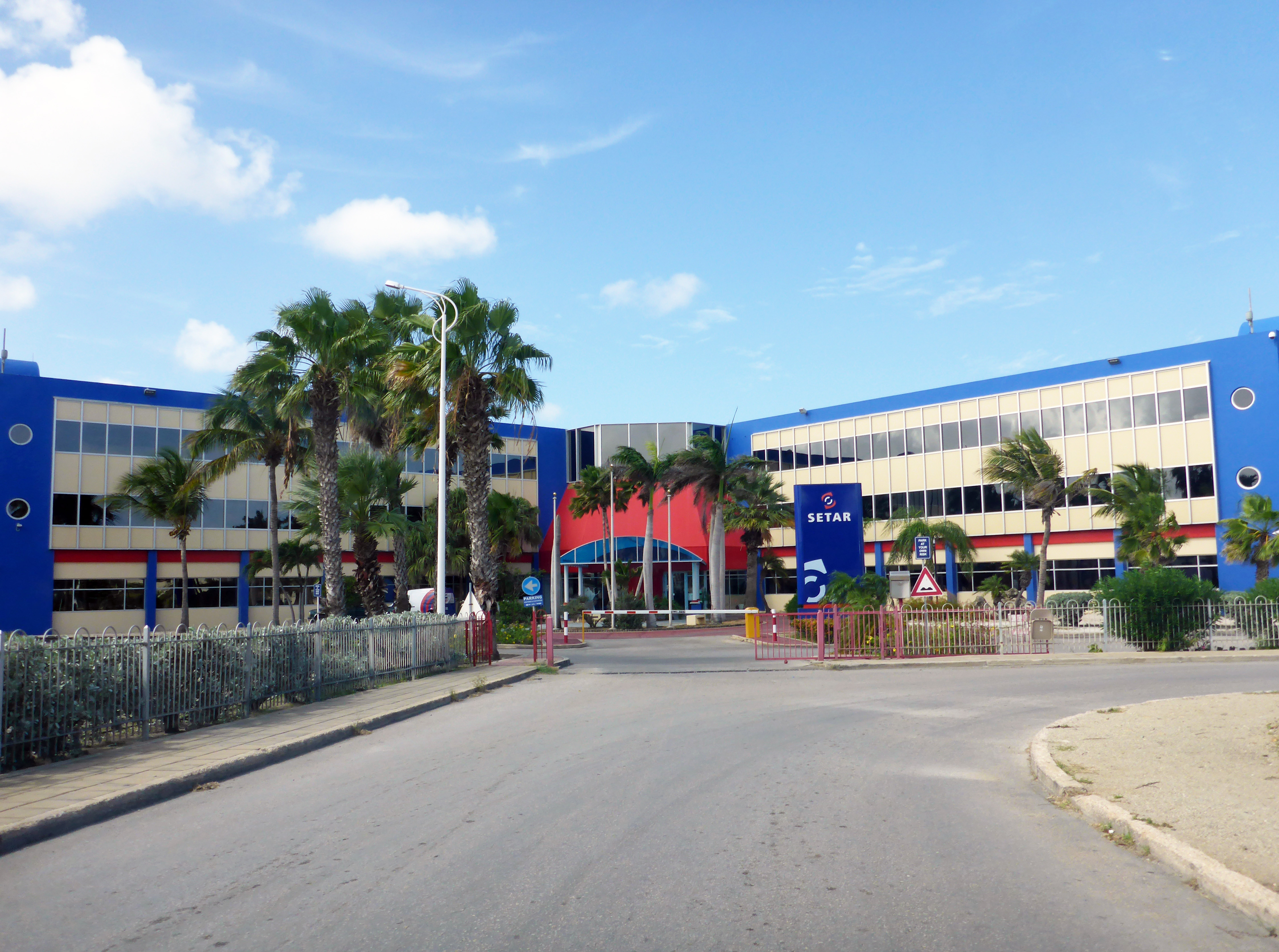
Setar headquarters in Oranjestad

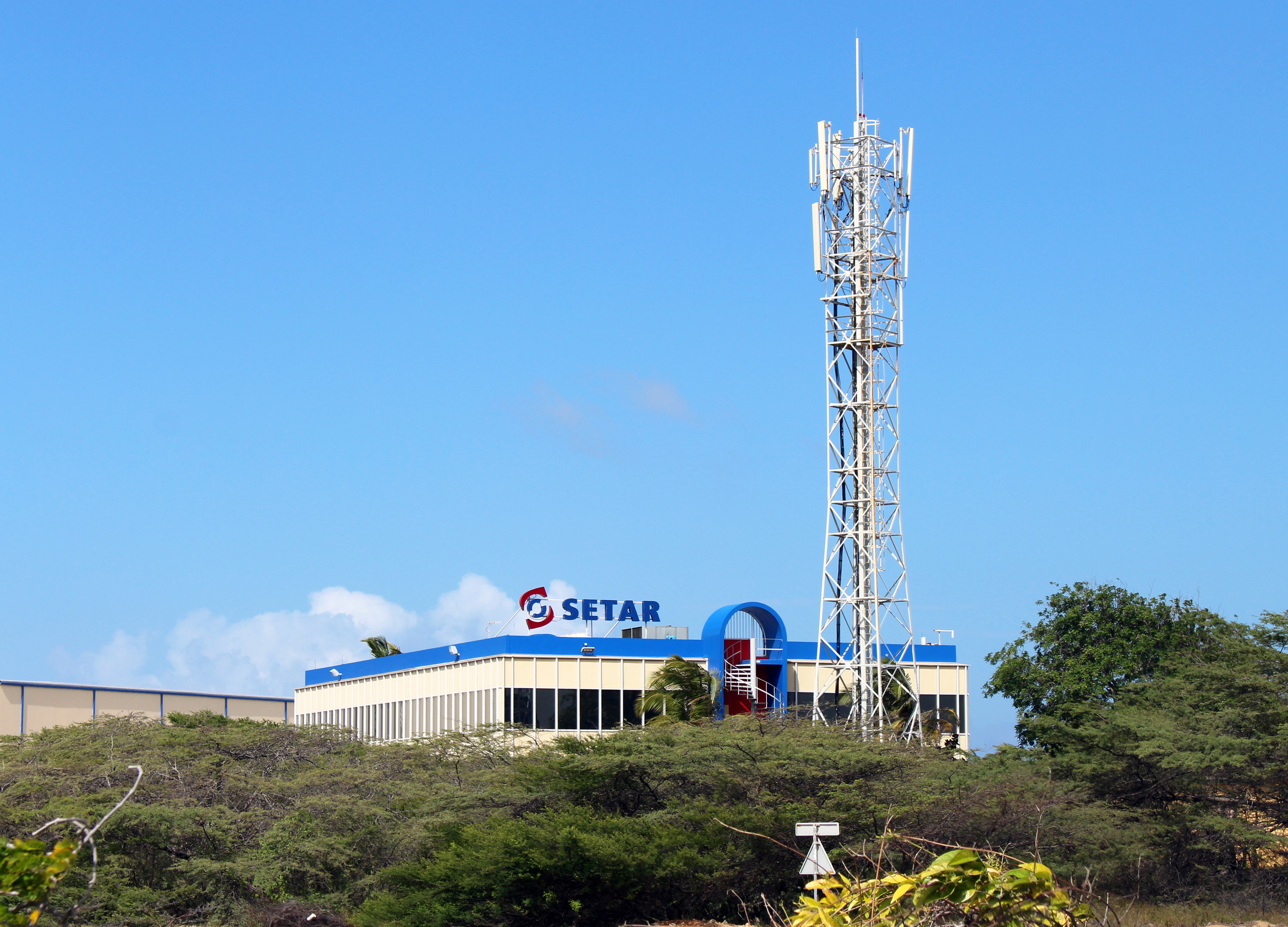
Antenna at Setar headquarters

SETAR N.V., is the privatised full telecommunications service provider for the island of Aruba. The services provided by SETAR include: telephone, internet and GSM-related Wireless services. SETAR also owns Telearuba. SETAR has been in operation on Aruba for over 10 years. Annual sales are offered by SETAR, especially during the holidays.

With the rapid global emergence of telecommunications technology, SETAR installed its first digital telephone systems and a satellite ground station on the Hooiberg in 1989. This investment allowed Aruba to communicate directly via satellite with the rest of the world. A local digital exchange was set up between 1990 and 1991 and a second satellite ground station was installed in 1993 to support satellite communications and the cellular network. The exchanges are connected by fiber optic cable.
