= Military of Aruba =

Defense on Aruba is the responsibility of the Kingdom of the Netherlands. The Netherlands Military forces that protect Aruba include the Royal Netherlands Navy, the Netherlands Marine Corps and the Dutch Caribbean Coast Guard. There is also a small indigenous militia (ARUMIL, literally "Aruban militia") of about platoon strength (stationed at the Marine Corps Barracks Savaneta). ARUMIL is together with the Curaçaose military (CURMIL) part of the Caribbean military (CARMIL).

== Early history ==
Until 1929, there were hardly any military forces present on the Dutch Antilles including Aruba. On 28 June 1929 the Venezuelan rebel leader Rafael Simón Urbina attacked Curaçao and took several hostages amongst whom was the governor Leonard Albert Fruytier and the garrison commander Borren. They were all taken to Venezuela where Urbina had hoped to overthrow the government. His attempt failed and Urbina was taken prisoner. All hostages were returned to Curaçao. Three Dutch soldiers were killed in action during this attack. After Urbina's attack, the Dutch government decided to station one naval ship ("stationsschip") in the Antilles permanently. It also decided to raise a volunteer defense corps on both Curaçao and Aruba (Vrijwilligerskorps Curaçao (VKC) and Vrijwilligerskorps Aruba (VKA)). After World War II, the VKC and VKA were redesignated Antiliaanse Militie (ANTMIL) which still exists on Curaçao. When Aruba obtained its independence within the Kingdom of the Netherlands in 1986, the ANTMIL on Aruba was redesignated Arubaanse Militie or ARUMIL.

== World War II ==
For the Kingdom of the Netherlands, World War II started with the invasion of the Netherlands by Germany on 10 May 1940. Because of the Lago oil refinery at San Nicolas, Aruba was deemed strategically important to the allied war effort and that same night 180 French marines arrived on Aruba to assist the local military. On 6 July they were replaced by 120 British soldiers who in turn were replaced by the 4th Battalion Queens Own Cameron Highlanders in September. In December an artillery unit from the Dutch East Indies Army was sent to Aruba to improve the defences. Also in December military service became compulsory and the VKA grew in size. All soldiers were billeted near the oil refinery at Savaneta, the present location of the Marine barracks. Early 1942, the British troops were replaced by over a thousand American soldiers. The Dutch coastal batteries on Aruba and Curaçao engaged U-boats at least three times during World War II, during the attack on Aruba in February 1942 and again during the bombardment of Curaçao. Later a Dutch battery on Curaçao engaged another U-boat when it attacked an oil tanker sailing off the island. None of the batteries hit their targets.

== Present ==
The Netherlands Armed Forces deploy both ground and naval units in the Caribbean with some of these forces based on Aruba. These forces include:

- 32 Infantry Company of the Netherlands Marine Corps on Aruba;
- a Fast Raiding Interception and Special Forces Craft (FRISC) troop (fast boats);
- a guardship, normally a Holland-class offshore patrol vessel, from the Royal Netherlands Navy on station in the Caribbean on a rotational basis plus the support ship HNLMS Pelikaan operating out of Curaçao;
- ARUMIL militia elements;
- Elements of a Royal Marechaussee brigade of the Armed Forces.

Additionally, the Dutch Caribbean Coast Guard, under the direction of the Royal Netherlands Navy commander in the Caribbean, maintains a significant presence.

ARUMIL soldiers are volunteers and are led by their own NCOs and officers. The ARUMIL are trained by Netherlands Marine Corps. When basic training is completed every soldier in the ARUMIL becomes an Aruban Marine. Basic training and selection takes place on Aruba, further training takes place in either the Netherlands or Curaçao. ARUMIL officers have to complete the regular Netherlands Marine Corps Officers training course (Praktische opleiding tot officier der mariniers). The ARUMIL platoon works closely with the Dutch Marines company stationed at Aruba. The 32nd Raiding Squadron also performs training exercises on Aruba, sometimes together with marines of the United States.

An increase of instability in South America, specifically Venezuela, made the Netherlands heighten the security level and increase monitoring of the Dutch island in cooperation with the United States.
