= Raymondt Pimienta =

Aruban footballer

Personal information
- Date of birth: 7 May 1982 (age 44)
- Position: Midfielder

International career
Years	Team	Apps	(Gls)
2002–2008	Aruba	3	(0)

Raymondt Pimienta (born 7 May 1982) is an Aruban football player. He played for Aruba national team in 2002, 2004, and 2008.

== National team statistics ==
Aruba national team
Year	Apps	Goals
2002	1	0
2003	0	0
2004	1	0
2005	0	0
2006	0	0
2007	0	0
2008	1	0
Total	3	0
