= Ryan Tromp =

Aruban footballer

Personal information
- Date of birth: October 5, 1973 (age 53)
- Position: Goalkeeper

International career
Years	Team	Apps	(Gls)
1995–2002	Aruba	6	(0)

Ryan Tromp (born October 5, 1973) is an Aruban football player. He has played for Aruba national team.

== National team statistics ==
Aruba national team
Year	Apps	Goals
1995	1	0
2000	4	0
2002	1	0
Total		
