= Enrique Zschuschen =

Aruban footballer

Personal information
- Date of birth: May 30, 1975 (age 51)
- Position: Forward

International career
Years	Team	Apps	(Gls)
2004	Aruba	1	(0)

Enrique Zschuschen (born May 30, 1975) is an Aruban football player. He appeared once for the Aruba national team in 2004.
