= Languages of Aruba =

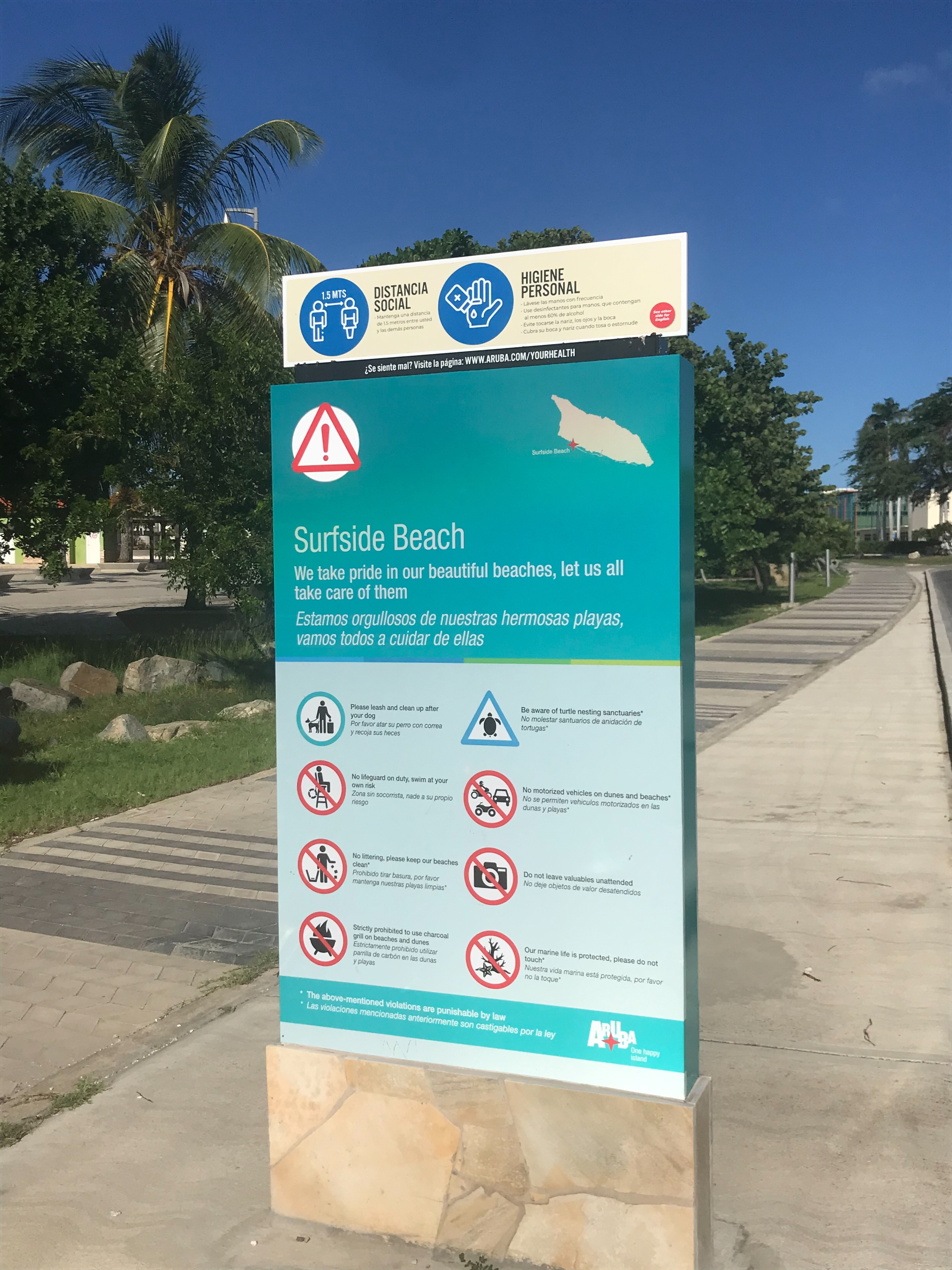
- COVID-19 sign in Aruba, written in Spanish and English Native language: Papiamento
- Official: Dutch, Papiamento English, Spanish
- Vernacular: Papiamento
- Foreign: English (mandatory); Spanish (mandatory); French
- Signed: Dutch Sign Language
- Keyboard layout: US international QWERTY

The official languages of the Caribbean island-state of Aruba are Papiamento and Dutch, but most Arubans speak a minimum of four languages, including English and Spanish. Schools require students to learn English, Spanish and to a lesser extent French. Other languages such as Portuguese, Chinese, Haitian Creole and many others are also spoken by smaller communities on the island. According to the Government of Aruba the mother tongue and primary language of almost all Arubans is Papiamento, an Afro-Portuguese Creole language with heavy Spanish influence spoken since the 16th century. The language, however, was not widespread in Aruba until the 18th and 19th centuries when most materials on the island and Roman Catholic schoolbooks were written in Papiamento. Since May 2003, Papiamento has also been made an official language on Aruba alongside Dutch.

Dutch has been one of the official languages of the island for years as the island is a part of the Kingdom of the Netherlands. It is the sole language for most administrative and legal matters.

Aruba has recognized English as an international language, and has required that children learn English as early as the 4th grade. Use of English on the island dates back to the early 19th century, when the British took Curaçao, Aruba and Bonaire; when Dutch rule over the islands resumed in 1815, officials noted the already widespread use of the language.

Due to Aruba's location off the coast of South America, many Arubans and immigrants are also fluent in Spanish. Students begin learning Spanish as early as 5th grade. Prior to Dutch rule, Aruba was a Spanish colony from 1499 to 1636. Spanish became an important language on the island in the 18th century due to proximity and close economic ties with nearby Spanish colonies in what are now Venezuela and Colombia, and several Venezuelan TV networks are received, and the fact that Aruba has many Venezuelan, Colombian and Dominican residents. Around 44% of the population today speaks Spanish.

Papiamento is a Creole language that evolved from Portuguese, Dutch, Spanish, some French, English, and a smattering of African and Amerindian languages. The language evolved in Curaçao during the 16th century when enslaved Africans and the Spanish enslavers developed common ground in which to communicate.

Papiamento was not considered important on Aruba until 1995. It was officially included in the school curriculum in 1998 and 1999. Since then, the island has embraced their native language. A Papiamento dictionary and fairy tales written in Papiamento are now readily available on the island.

Aruba is a multilingual society. Most of Aruba's population is able to converse in at least three of the languages of Papiamento, Dutch, English, and Spanish.

== Language distribution ==
According to the 2020 Census, 43.2% of Aruba's total population exclusively speaks Papiamento in their households. Among Aruba's 8 regions, 5 have over 50% of the population using only Papiamento at home, with Oranjestad East having the highest percentage at 56.6%, and San Nicolas South the lowest at 23.4%. Additionally, the Census indicates that 18.9% of the population reported Papiamento and Spanish as the two primary languages spoken in their households. In the regions Noord/Tanki Leendert and Oranjestad East, one in four persons speaks Papiamento and Spanish in the household, while San Nicolas North has the lowest percentage at 8.9%.

Census data also reveals that 9.4% of the population indicated that Papiamento and English were the two mostly spoken languages in the household. San Nicolas South and San Nicolas North are the 2 regions with the highest percentages of the population that speak Papiamento and English in the household at 28.7% and 12.3%, respectively. Papiamento and English are least spoken in households of persons living in the region of Santa Cruz (4.6%).

Additionally, the Census shows that 6.8% of Aruba's population speaks Papiamento and Dutch in their households. In all 8 regions, the percentage of the population that speaks these two languages at home is below 10%, with San Nicolas North having the lowest percentage at 1.5%.

Finally, the results of the 2020 Census revealed that in 18.6% of Aruba's households, Papiamento is not one of the two most spoken languages. At a regional level, nearly one third of the population in San Nicolas South (30.6%) indicated that Papiamento is not one of the two most spoken languages in their household. Conversely, in Paradera, the percentage of the population indicating that Papiamento is not one of the two most spoken languages in their household is the lowest at 11.6%. In total, in Paradera, 85.2% of the population speaks Papiamento at home, either exclusively or in combination with another language.

Census 2020: Language distribution per region in percentage
Nr.	Regions	Papiamento	Papiamento Spanish	Papiamento English	Papiamento Dutch
1	Noord/Tanki Leendert	31.2	25.3	9.4	9.7
2	Oranjestad West	27.3	28.3	10.7	6.2
3	Oranjestad East	56.6	11.3	5.7	5.0
4	Paradera	51.3	17.5	6.9	9.5
5	Santa Cruz	52.0	20.4	4.6	7.7
6	Savaneta	51.5	12.1	8.4	3.3
7	San Nicolas North	53.0	8.9	12.3	1.5
8	San Nicolas South	23.4	11.9	28.7	3.2
	National Average	43.2	18.9	9.4	6.8

== Selected Aruban Papiamento phrases ==
Papiamento	Spanish	Portuguese	Dutch	English
Bon dia	Buenos días	Bom dia	Goedemorgen	Good morning
Bon tardi	Buenas tardes	Boa tarde	Goedemiddag	Good afternoon
Bon nochi	Buenas noches	Boa noite	Goedenavond	Good night
Bon bini	Bienvenido	Bem vindo	Welkom	Welcome
Danki	Gracias	Obrigado	Dank u/Dank je	Thank you
Ayo	Adiós	Adeus	Tot ziens	Good-bye
Pasa un bon dia	Que tenga/Que pase un buen día	Tenha um bom dia	Fijne dag	Have a good day
Con cos ta? (Informal) Con ta bay? (Formal)	¿Cómo estás?/¿Cómo te va?	Como vai?/Tudo bem?	Hoe gaat het?	How are you?
Mi ta bon	(Yo) Estoy bien	(Eu) Estou bem	Met mij gaat het goed	I am fine
Cuant'or tin?	¿Qué hora es?	Que hora é?/Que horas são?	Hoe laat is het?	What time is it?
Mi por papia Papiamento	(Yo) Puedo hablar papiamento	(Eu) Posso falar papiamento	Ik spreek Papiaments	I can speak Papiamento
Si	Sí	Sim	Ja	Yes
No	No	Não	Nee	No
Aruba ta bunita	Aruba es bonita	Aruba é bonita	Aruba is mooi	Aruba is beautiful
