= List of streams of Aruba =

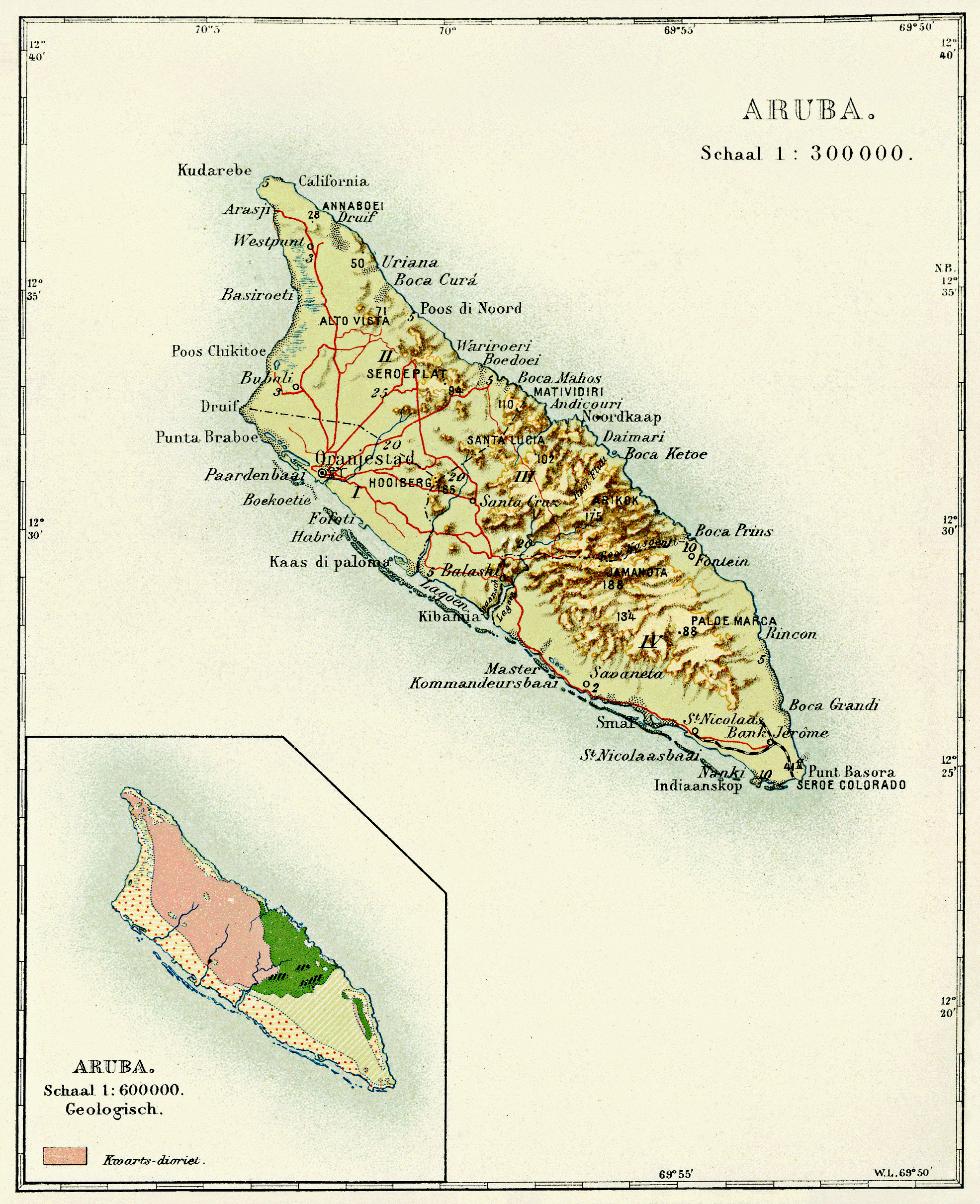
Map of Aruba

This is a list of streams of Aruba. Streams (rooi from the Dutch word) are listed in alphabetical order. Water from these streams flows into the Caribbean Sea watershed. There are no rivers, per se, in Aruba. The link to the right shows a map of Aruba with the location of the mouths of the streams annotated.

== Streams ==
The names and coordinates of the mouths of the streams in Aruba are listed below:

- Rooi Afo, 12°31′19″N 70°01′16″W
- Rooi Awa Marga, 12°32′04″N 69°57′29″W
- Rooi Bosal, 12°28′40″N 69°59′10″W
- Rooi Cochi, 12°26′48″N 69°56′16″W
- Rooi Congo, 12°26′39″N 69°54′52″W
- Rooi Dwars, 12°29′22″N 69°54′57″W
- Rooi Fluit, 12°31′33″N 69°56′05″W
- Rooi Frances, 12°28′57″N 69°58′19″W
- Rooi Hundu, 12°26′18″N 69°54′08″W
- Rooi Lamunchi, 12°27′30″N 69°57′29″W
- Rooi Manonchi, 12°30′56″N 70°02′06″W
- Rooi Master, 12°26′27″N 69°55′29″W
- Rooi Prikichi, 12°32′43″N 69°58′55″W
- Rooi Prins, 12°29′44″N 69°54′33″W
- Rooi Santo, 12°35′06″N 70°02′31″W
- Rooi Spoki, 12°26′30″N 69°54′12″W
- Rooi Taki, 12°28′48″N 69°58′12″W
- Rooi Tambú, 12°30′17″N 69°55′13″W
- Rooi Thomas, 12°29′38″N 69°54′12″W

== See also ==
- List of rivers of the Americas
- List of rivers of the Americas by coastline
- List of streams of the Dutch Caribbean
- National Geospatial-Intelligence Agency
- GEOnet Names Server
