= Gerald Zimmermann =

Aruban footballer

Personal information
- Date of birth: January 16, 1973 (age 53)
- Position: Midfielder

International career
Years	Team	Apps	(Gls)
2000–2004	Aruba	5	(0)

Gerald Zimmermann (born January 16, 1973) is an Aruban football player. He has played for Aruba national team.

== National team statistics ==
Aruba national team
Year	Apps	Goals
2000	3	0
2002	1	0
2004	1	0
Total	5	0
