= Constitution of Aruba =

Official constitution of Aruba

Aruba's Constitution (Dutch: Staatsregeling; Papiamento: Constitucion di Aruba) was unanimously approved by all political parties represented in Aruba's Parliament on a January 1, 1986, and was proclaimed in the Afkondigingsblad van Aruba, No.26, 1985, on January 1, 1986.

The Constitution is based on democratic Western principles and provides for a governor, (appointed by the King of the Netherlands) for a six-year term, as the monarch's representative. An elected prime minister heads the local government and receives legislation from the eight-member Council of Ministers. The Parliament of Aruba has legislative powers. Judicial powers are carried out by the common court, the Justice Court of Aruba, and at the Supreme Court of the Netherlands

Aruba Constitution was approved unanimously on August 9, 1985, and was proclaimed on August 19, 1985

On January 1, 1986, Aruba gained Status aparte and became a constituent country within the Kingdom of the Netherlands, which now consists of the four constituent countries: Aruba, Curacao, St. Maarten and the Netherlands. The Kingdom of the Netherlands Government handles defense, citizenship and foreign affairs.
