= Santa Cruz, Aruba =

Santa Cruz
- Town and region
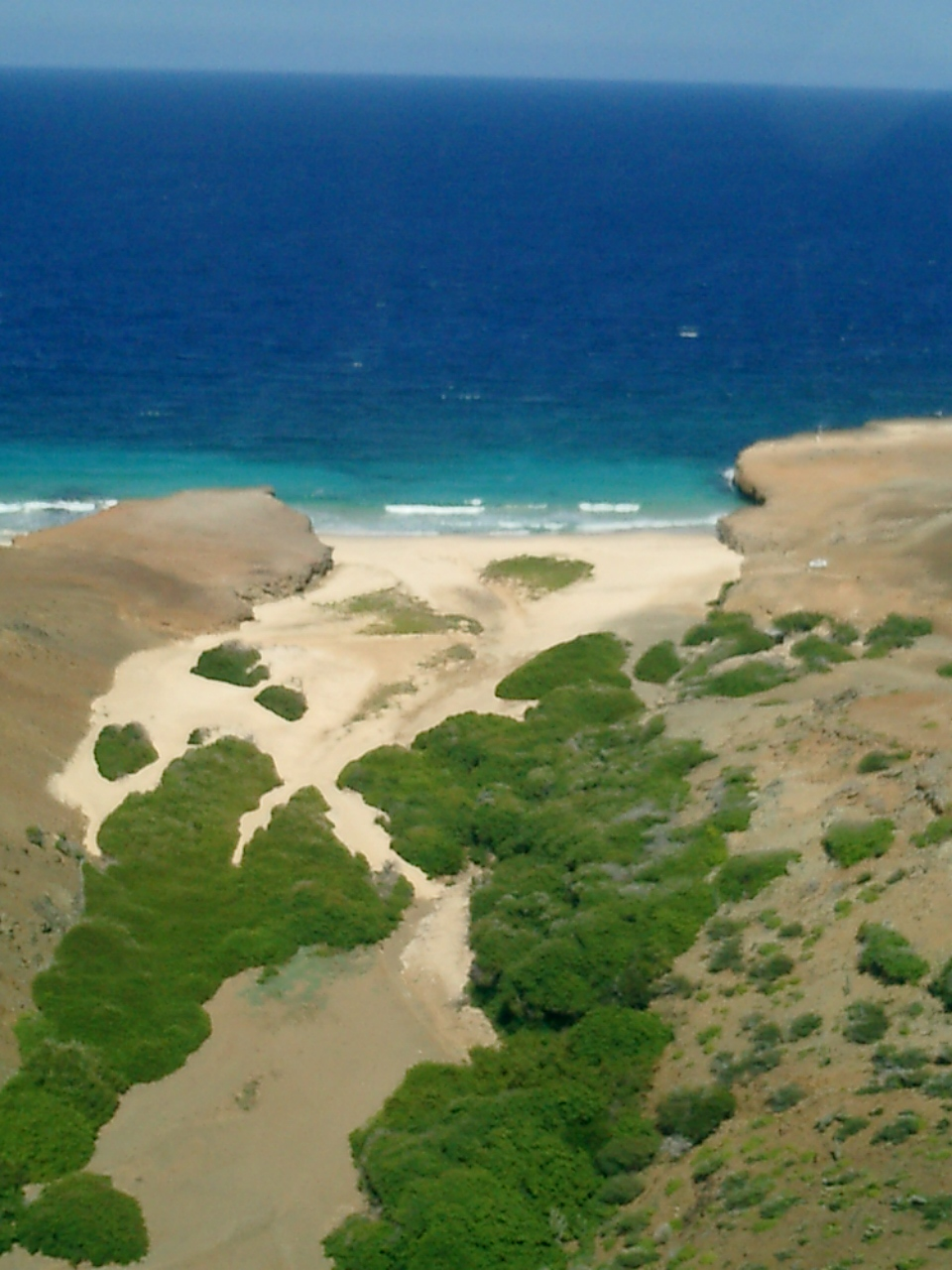
- Daimari Bay
- Interactive map of Santa Cruz
- Coordinates: 12°30′N 69°58′W
- Country: Aruba
- Region: Santa Cruz

Government
  - Mayor: Magda Wever

Area
  - Total: 47.0 km^{2} (18.1 sq mi)

Population (2020)
  - Total: 15,236
  - Density: 324.2/km^{2} (840/sq mi)
- Time zone: UTC-4 (AST)

Santa Cruz (Dutch pronunciation: [saːntaː.kruːz]) is a Region and Town in central Aruba, dominated by the Arikok National Park. The town is connected by Highway 7 from west to east and Highway 4 from north to south. The district has an area of 41.04 square kilometers and 12,870 inhabitants according to the 2010 census.

Santa Cruz is divided into several neighborhoods, including, but not limited to, Boton, Bringamosa, Cas Ariba, Jamanota, Jan Flemming, Macuarima, San Fuego, Shete, Siribana, Urataka, Warawara, and Catashi.

== Macuarima ==
Macuarima is a town in the Santa Cruz region. The town has been named after Macuarima, an Amerindian chief who lived on Aruba. In 1499, the Spanish invaded the island, and Macuarima was killed trying to defend his homeland. Nowadays, Macuarima is best known as a play by Ernesto Rosenstand.

== Notable people ==
- Betico Croes (1938–1986), teacher and politician.
- Liza Helder (1989), model and Miss Aruba 2012.
- Annuar Kock (1991), footballer.
- Calvin Maduro (1974), professional baseball player.
- Laura Wernet-Paskel (1911–1962), teacher, writer and politician.
