= Sunday River Golf Club =

Golf club in Maine

Coordinates: 44°29′N 70°54′W

Sunday River Golf Club is an 18-hole, semi-private golf club located in the Town of Newry, in Oxford County, in the Western mountains of Maine. It was designed by famed golf course architect Robert Trent Jones, Jr.

Designed in the early 1990s, the construction of the course began in 2003 under the leadership of Harris Golf.

The course opened to rave reviews in 2005. Since its opening it has received accolades from such notable golf publications as Travel + Leisure Golf, Golf Week Magazine, Golf Styles New England and the Robb Report.

In 2012 Sunday River Golf Club hosted the Maine Amateur Golf Championship.

The course is now owned by Newry Holdings LLC and operated by Sunday River Resort as of 2019.
