= Alto Vista Chapel =

Chapel in Aruba

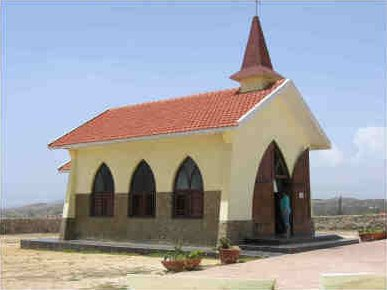
- Alto Vista Chapel

Religion
- Affiliation: Roman Catholic
- Ecclesiastical or organisational status: Oratory
- Year consecrated: Originally consecrated in 1750, rebuilt in 1952
- Status: Active

Location
- Location: Noord, Aruba
- Country: Aruba
- Interactive map of Alto Vista Chapel
- Coordinates: 12.5759°N 70.0109°W

Architecture
- Completed: 1952

Specifications
- Direction of façade: East
- Length: 50 ft (15 m)
- Width: 16 ft (4.9 m)
- Materials: Stone

Alto Vista Chapel is a small Catholic chapel that stands on the hills above the north shore of the sea and to the northeast of the town of Noord, on the island of Aruba, 27 km north of the coast of Venezuela. The church, painted on the outside in stark bright yellow, makes it a conspicuous religious monument for people to visit. The present Chapel of Alto Vista was completed in 1952 and stands in the same location as the original chapel, which was built by Domingo Silvestre, the Venezuelan missionary from Santa Ana de Coro, Venezuela, in 1750.

The Alto Vista Chapel was stated to be the location where conversion of Aruban Indians to Christianity started.

== Geography ==
The chapel located on the Aruba Island is situated close to Noord at its northeastern corner, and 8 kilometres (5.0 mi) from the California Lighthouse. Queen Beatrix International Airport is at Oranjestad, from where the entire island is connected by a network of roads. Bike tours are also a popular way of visiting the natural wonders in the north and northeast coast, including the Alto Vista Chapel. It is situated amidst desert environment of sand, shrubs and cactus. The village that was established by the missionaries was called Alto Vista, meaning "high view," as it was situated on a hillock overlooking the sea, providing a complete view of the island.

The church has easy access from Noord, though the roads are not paved and hence dusty. This road is winding and has a string of crosses all along its route.

Close to the chapel is the Arikok National Park with several known limestone caves, popular hiking trails covering all types of terrain from hills to gold mines, beaches, plantation ruins, Arawak Indian wall drawings, Aruba Ostrich Farm and many more.

== History ==
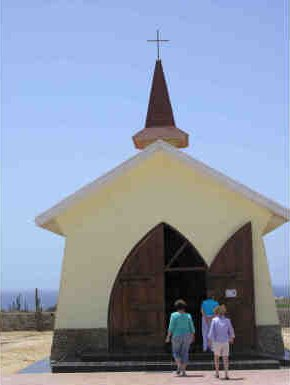
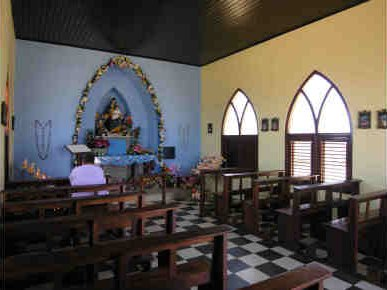
Left: Devotees at the entrance of Chapel at Alto Vista. Right: The inside of the Alto Vista Chapel

The original church was constructed in 1750 by Caquetio Indians and Spanish though the island did not have a priest yet. The pioneering work of establishing the church and converting local Indians into the Catholic Christian faith was the sole work of Domingo Antonio Silvestre of Venezuela, which he achieved with his own funds. It is said to be the first church to be established in Aruba. This first church was built with stone walls and a straw roof. It was dedicated to Mother St. Mary, the “Mother of the Rosary” and hence considered exceptional in Aruba. A one-foot cross, which was brought from Venezuela by one of the priests, was installed here. Subsequent to Domingo Antonio Silvestre's death Miguel Enrique Albarez (a son of the second fiscal) took control of the church, and then by Domingo Bernardino Silvestre son of the pioneer priest of the church. When the tragic plague stuck the place, many of the inhabitants of Alto Vista died and the remaining residents vacated the place and moved to Noord where the second church of Aruba was built. The Alto Vista Church was deserted from 1816 and went into ruins and the old wooden cross went under possession of many priests. This cross which was at the original altar is now seen in the St. Ann's church in Noord. However, Francisca, a school teacher in Aruba, with single-minded dedication proceeded to revive the historic church of Aruba by locating it amidst the ruins after she came across by chance a picture of St. Mary's with flowers. She collected funds of about 5000 Florins from local Arubans, got a statue of St. Mary's made in Netherlands and brought it to Alto Vista and installed it at the new church built at the site of the old chapel, between March and May 1952, after obtaining permission from the Bishop in Curaçau. The statue was adorned with a golden crown studded with gem stones in 1954 with donations contributed by several Arubians. Unfortunately this statue was vandalized by a maniac. The statue has since been replaced by a new one. With this chapel, Catholic religion made inroads into Aruba.

The present day church, rebuilt in 1952, is visited by Christians and non-Christians for meditation. Services are held weekly by the priest from Noord.

== Architecture and fittings ==
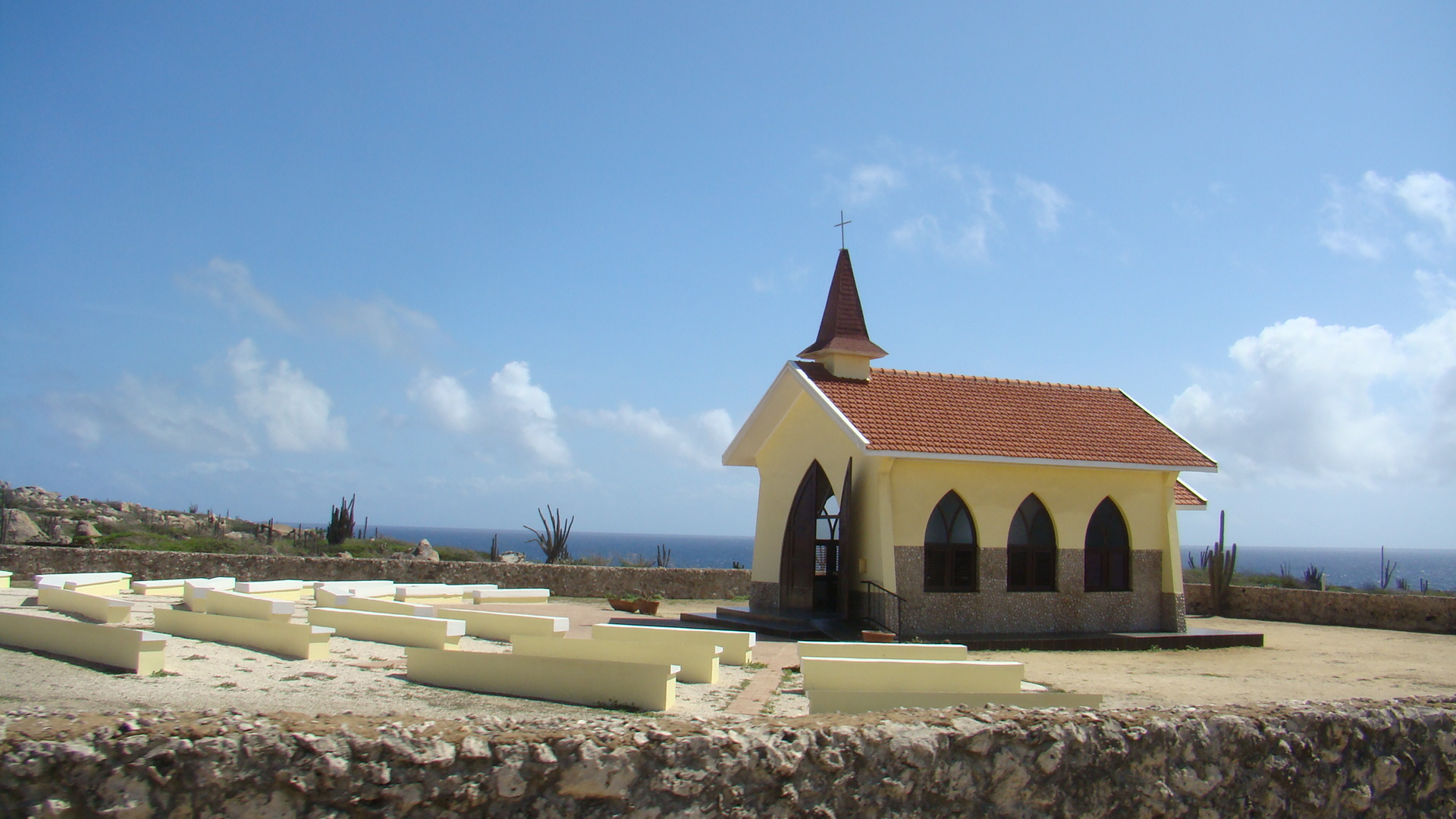
Stone pews outside Alto Vista Chapel

The new chapel was redesigned and built in 1952 by the Dutch engineer J.A. Hille, deputy head of the DOW (Dienst Openbare Werken), at the same location of an old chapel that measured 50×15 feet (15.2×4.6 m) and with the same orientation. The chapel is encircled by semicircular pews. There are also stone pews on the outside in order to accommodate additional worshipers. It has a few crosses enshrined in it; the ancient Spanish one is one of the oldest European pieces of art in the Dutch Caribbean. An altar statue of Virgin Mary installed after the earlier one was vandalised has local devotees. The structure does not have any stained glass panelled windows but presents a very serene atmosphere for offering prayers. At the border of the old chapel marked by stones, a few graves are also seen. White graves with crosses marking the stations of the Cross surround the chapel. Graves of Domingo Antonio Silvestre and Miguel Enrique Albarez are located near the chapel.

When the chapel was initially built in 1752, priests visited it from Coro three times every year. People used to wait eagerly to celebrate mass and perform Catholic Services such as baptisms and marriages.

== Pilgrimage ==
A pilgrimage is undertaken on foot by local Catholics of Aruba on Good Friday from Oranjestad to Alto Vista Chapel.
