= Arashi (disambiguation) =

Arashi is a Japanese boy band.

Arashi (あらし) may also refer to:

== People with the given name ==
- Arashi Fujihara (藤原 あらし, born 1978), Japanese kickboxer and Muay Thai fighter
- Arashi Morisaka (森坂 嵐, born 1996), Japanese boxer
- Kanjūrō Arashi (嵐 寛壽郎, 1903–1980), Japanese film actor

== Fictional characters ==
- Arashi, nickname of Sayako Arashiyama, a character in the Japanese anime Natsu no Arashi!
- Arashi Ishino, a character in the 1980s Japanese anime Game Center Arashi
- Arashi, Nagi's sister in the My-Otome manga
- Arashi Kishū, a member of the Dragons of Heaven in the series X
- Arashi Mikami, protagonist of the Japanese manga series Triage X
- Arashi Narukami (鳴上 嵐, Narukami Arashi), a member of Knights in the series Ensemble Stars!
- Chisato Arashi (嵐 千砂都, Arashi Chisato), a member of Liella in the media franchise Love Live! Superstar!!

== Media ==
- Arashi (video game), a freeware remake of the Atari Tempest video game for Classic Mac OS
- Arashi (film), a 1956 Japanese film
- "Arashi" (song), a song by the boy band Arashi

== Other uses ==
- Japanese destroyer Arashi, Kagerō-class destroyer of the Imperial Japanese Navy
- Arashi Beach, a beach in Aruba of the Caribbean
- Arashi, a stage name used by professional wrestler Isao Takagi
