= Royal Dornoch Golf Club =

Golf club in Dornoch, Sutherland, Scotland

Royal Dornach Golf Club
- Location in Scotland
- 57.879°N 4.023°W

Club information
- Location: Dornoch, Sutherland, Scotland, UK
- Established: 1877, 149 years ago
- Total holes: 36
- Website: royaldornoch.com

Championship Course
- Par: 70
- Length: 6,748 yd (6,170 m)
- Course rating: 73
- Slope rating: 136

Struie Course
- Par: 71
- Length: 6,265 yd (5,729 m)
- Course rating: 70
- Slope rating: 125

Royal Dornoch Golf Club is a golf club in Dornoch, Sutherland, Scotland. It is generally referred to as Royal Dornoch. The club has two 18-hole courses: the Championship Course and the Struie Course. Both are links courses located on the Dornoch Firth.

Royal Dornoch has never hosted any of the modern professional tournaments. The British Amateur Championship was held there in 1985 and the Scottish Amateur in 1993, 2000, 2012, and 2023. The Women's and Men's Senior Amateur championships were held there in 2022.

The Championship Course was ranked No. 2 on the 2024/24 Golf Digest list of Top 100 International (outside U.S.) courses. David Brice, of Golf International, called it the "king of Scottish links courses". It was named No. 1 in the world by the online golf reservation service Golfscape..

== History ==
Golf was played in Dornoch, over the extensive linksland there, in the early seventeenth century, circa 1616. Expenses covering the cost of a young aristocrat's golf clubs in 1616 have provided the earliest evidence so far of the sport's presence in Dornoch. John, the 13th Earl of Sutherland, was sent to the town in Sutherland to be educated. The reference was uncovered by researcher Wade Cormack, who is a PhD student at the University of the Highlands and Islands. The current golf club was established 149 years ago in 1877, and was awarded its royal status in 1906 by King Edward VII.

Much of the design of the Championship Course is attributed to Old Tom Morris who visited in 1886 and 1889. Several of the original holes were lost to the construction of an airfield during World War II. After the war, George Duncan was commissioned to restore and extend the course over newly acquired land. The work introduced the present 6th through 11th holes on the Championship Course.

The course architect Donald Ross grew up in Dornoch, and following an apprenticeship with Old Tom Morris in St Andrews who taught him club-making and greenkeeping, he became Dornoch's first professional and 'keeper of the green' between 1893 and 1899, the year he emigrated to America.

Tom Watson is an honorary member of Royal Dornoch. He first visited in 1981 and played twice in one day with his friend Sandy Tatum, the second round in a storm, and he reckoned it the most fun he ever had on a golf course.

In September 2005 members of the club travelled to the northwest United States in for a friendly international competition and cultural exchange with the Coeur d'Alene Tribe at their Circling Raven Golf Club in northern Idaho.

== Expansion Plans ==
In October 2024, the club completed the purchase of 50 acres (20 ha) of land from an adjacent farm.

In 2025 the plans were announced for a third 18-hole course, to complement the existing Championship and Struie courses. New holes will be created on the Struie Course, and a nine-hole par-3 course, driving range and short game and putting area will also be added. US-based King Collins Dormer Golf Course Design will oversee the work.

A new clubhouse – a £13.9 million project – opened in December 2025.

== See also ==
- List of golf clubs granted Royal status
