= Tierra del Sol Salina =

Important Bird Area of Aruba in the Dutch Caribbean

- Salt pan
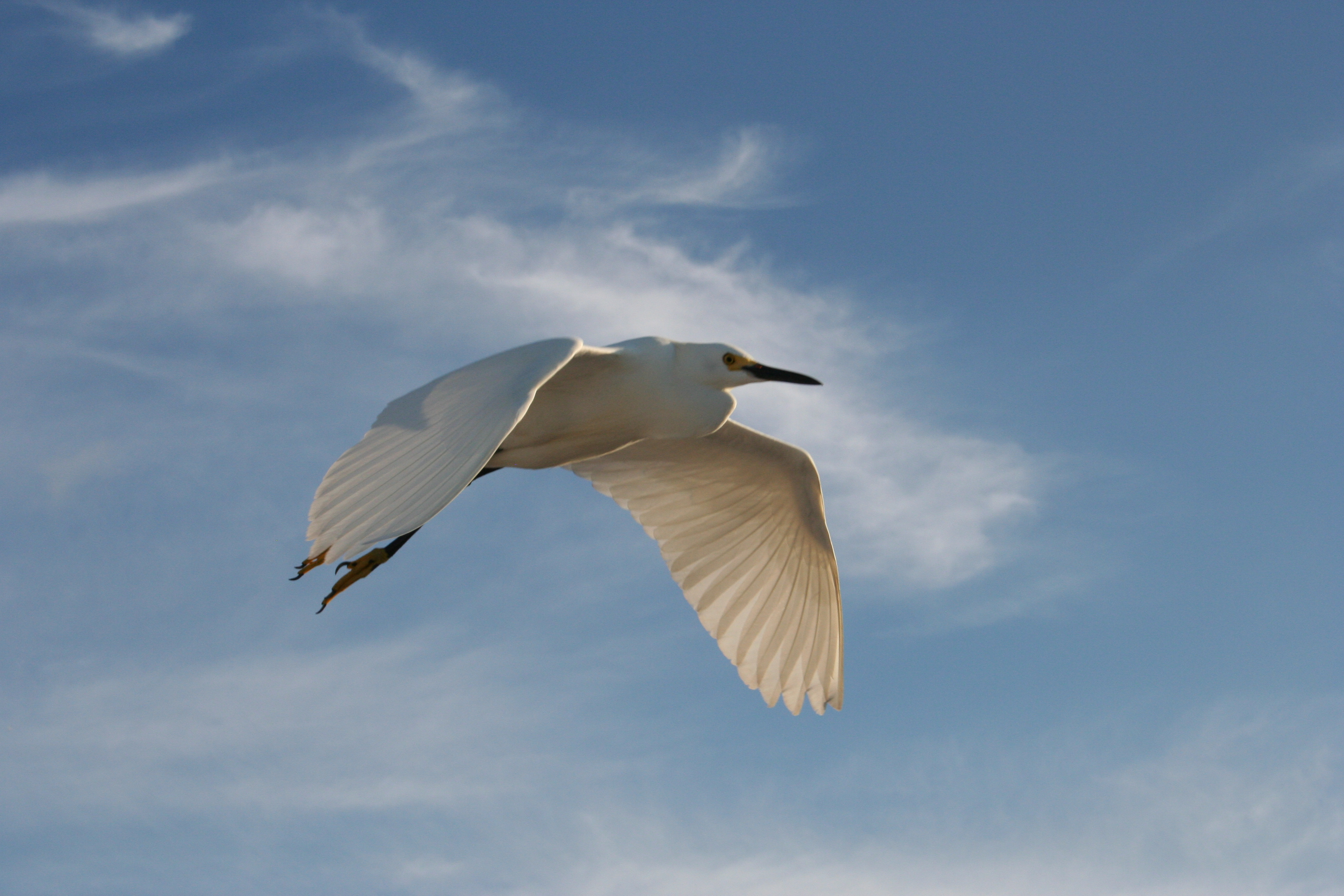
- Snowy egrets breed at the salina

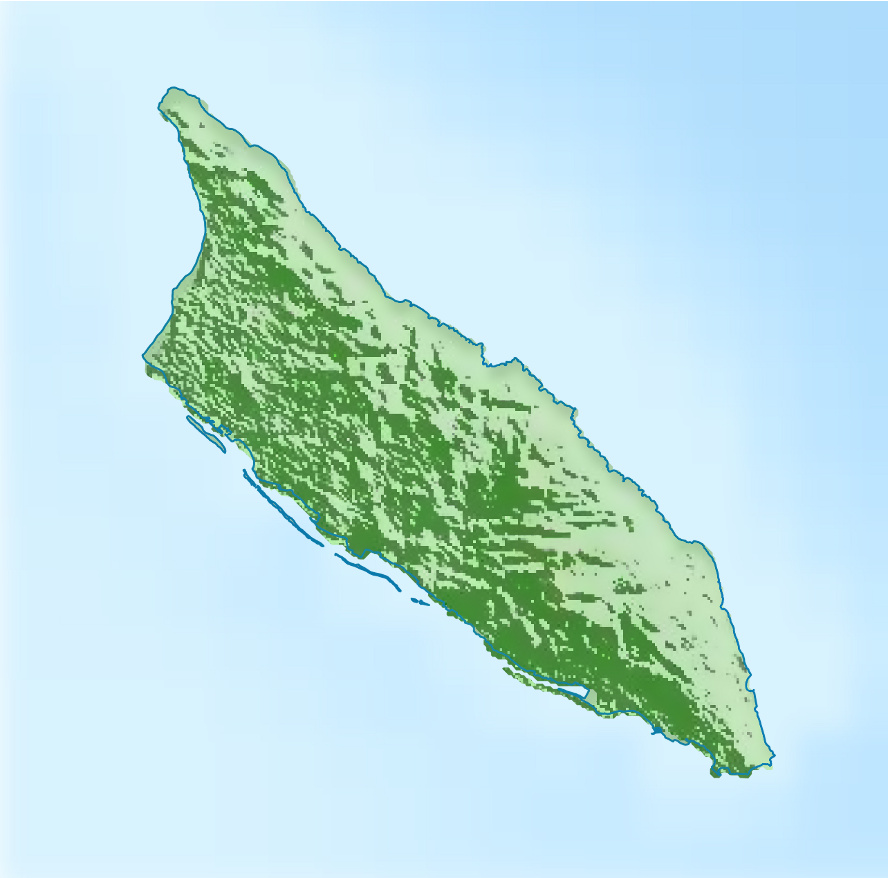
- Location in Aruba
- Coordinates: 12°36′22″N 70°02′14″W
- Location: Noord, Aruba

Area
  - Total: 1 hectare (2.5 acres)

Tierra del Sol Salina is a 1 ha natural saliña, surrounded by desert scrub vegetation, lying within the golf-course of the Tierra del Sol Resort, Spa & Country Club at the northwestern end of Aruba, a constituent island nation of the Kingdom of the Netherlands in the Dutch Caribbean. It periodically contains water, and has a natural flow to the sea. It has been identified as an Important Bird Area by BirdLife International as a breeding site for great and snowy egrets, American coots and white-cheeked pintails when it contains water, as well as serving as a roost site for roseate and Sandwich terns, and black skimmers. It is also used during the spring and autumn migration seasons by waders while the surrounding vegetation supports neotropical passerines, especially warblers. Bare-eyed pigeons are resident.
