= Robert Trent Jones Jr. =

American golf course architect

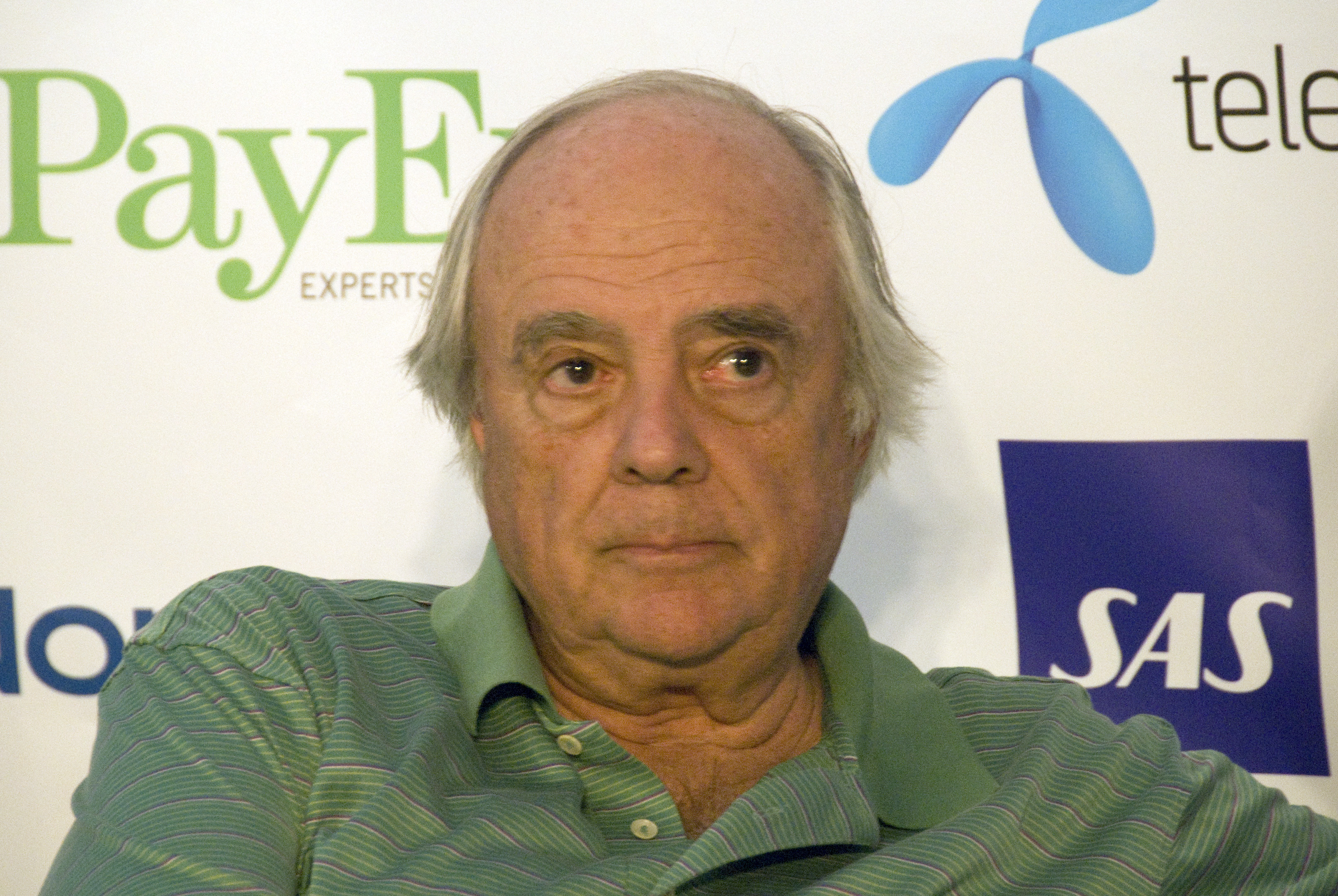
- Jones 2010
- Born: July 24, 1939 (age 87); Montclair, New Jersey, U.S.
- Education: Yale University (BA); Stanford University (dropped out)
- Occupation: Golf course architect
- Spouse: Anne Claiborne Smith (m. 1961)
- Children: 2 (Robert Trent Jones III, Elizabeth Taliaferro Jones)
- Father: Robert Trent Jones
- Relatives: Rees Jones (brother)
- Website: www.rtj2.com

Robert Trent "Bobby" Jones Jr. (born July 24, 1939) is an American golf course architect. He is the son of golf course designer Robert Trent Jones and the brother of golf course designer Rees Jones.

== Early life ==
Jones was born on July 24, 1939, in Montclair, New Jersey, the son of Robert Trent Jones Sr. (1906–2000). He graduated from Montclair High School in 1957. Jones attended Yale University where he played on the Yale Bulldogs golf team and was a part of the university's Beta Theta Pi fraternity. After graduating from Yale in 1961, Jones spent one year at Stanford Law School and then dropped out to join his father's firm: Robert Trent Jones Incorporated. He rose to become vice-president of the company and assumed control of west coast operations in 1962.

== Career ==
In the 1960s, Jones began designing courses on his own and formed his own company in the early 1970s in Palo Alto, California. His first solo project was in 1971, and redesigned in 2009, at Princeville Makai Golf Club at Princeville Resort, in Hawaiʻi on the North Shore of Kauaʻi. He has since designed or remodeled more than 250 golf courses during his career. In 1979, the Northern California Golf Association selected Jones to design the Poppy Hills Golf Course in Pebble Beach, California. His father, Robert Jones Sr., had previously crafted the Spyglass Hill Golf Course in Pebble Beach, and during this project, he received valuable assistance from his son. Their combined expertise has helped them to design over 400 golf courses worldwide.

Jones continues to design courses and currently resides in Woodside, California. He has also served as the president of the American Society of Golf Course Architects, former chairman of the California State Park and Recreation Commission and has published a book entitled Golf by Design designed to help players understand golf course layout.

== Personal life ==
Jones Jr. married Anne Claiborne Smith in 1961. The couple have a son named Robert Trent Jones III and a daughter Elizabeth Taliaferro Jones.

== Courses designed ==
=== With Robert Trent Jones Incorporated ===
- Willow Lakes Golf Course, Nebraska (1964)
- Silverado-South, Northern California (1967)
- Eugene Country Club, Oregon (1968)
- Karuizawa 72 Golf, Japan (1972)

=== With Robert Trent Jones II Company ===
- Adobe Creek, Petaluma, California (1989)
- Alcanada Golf (18 holes) 2013, Port d'Alcúdia, Mallorca, Balearic Islands, Spain (2003)
- Arizona National Golf Club (opened as The Raven Club at Sabino Springs), Tucson, Arizona (1996)
- Arrowhead, Colorado (1974)
- Ayala Greenfield Estates, Laguna, Philippines (2000)
- Bahia Beach Resort & Golf Club, Rio Grand, Puerto Rico (2008)
- Bjaavann Golfklubb, Kristiansand, Norway (2005)
- Bro Hof Slott Golf Club, Stockholm, Sweden (2007)
- Brookside Country Club, Stockton, California (1991)
- Chambers Bay, University Place, Washington (2007)
- Charter Oak Country Club, Hudson, Massachusetts (2001)
- Cochiti Lake, New Mexico (1980)
- CordeValle Golf Club, San Martin, California (1996)
- Coto de Caza North, Coto de Caza, California (1987)
- Coto de Caza South, Coto de Caza, California (1995)
- Cragun's Legacy Courses (Bobby's Legacy, Dutch Legacy and Reversible 9), Brainerd, Minnesota (1998, 2000, 2002)
- Crystal Tree Country Club, Orland Park, Illinois (1989)
- Damai Indah Golf Pantai Indah Kapuk Course, Jakarta, Indonesia (1992)
- Deer Creek, Overland Park, Kansas (1989)
- Desert Dunes Golf Club, Desert Hot Springs, California (1988)
- Eagle Point Golf Club, Medford, Oregon (1995)
- Edinburgh USA Golf Club, Brooklyn Park, Minnesota (1987)
- Empress Josephine Golf Course, Les Trois-llets, Martinique (1977)
- Estrella del Mar, Mazatlan, México, (1996)
- Fairmont Chateau Whistler Golf Club, Whistler, Canada (1993)
- Glencoe Golf & Country Club, Calgary, Alberta (Glen Forest and Glen Meadows courses) (1983–85)
- Golf & Country Club de Bossey, Bossey, Haute-Savoie, France (1985)
- Golf Club Castelconturbia, Agrate Conturbia, Italy (1989)
- Golf de Bondues, the back nine, Bondues, France (1990)
- Golf International de St. Francois Saint Francois, Guadeloupe (1978)
- Greenhorn Creek, Angels Camp, California (1996)
- Heron Lakes Golf Club, Portland, Oregon (1968, 1992)
- Highland Springs Country Club, Springfield, Missouri (1989)
- Hoiana Shores Golf Club, Hoi An, Vietnam (2020)
- Holtsmark Golfclub, Sylling, Norway (2006)
- Jefferson County Club, Blacklick, Ohio (1992)
- Joondalup, Western Australia (1985)
- Kaluhyat Golf Club, Verona, New York (2003)
- Keystone Ranch, Colorado (1980)
- Lake Shastina Golf Resort, Weed, California (1973)
- Las Sendas Country Club, Mesa, Arizona (1995)
- Lansdowne Resort, The Jones Course, Leesburg, Virginia (1991)
- le Golf du Chateau de la Chouette, Gaillon-Sur-Montcient, France (1998)
- Le Triomphe Golf and Country Club, Broussard, Louisiana (1986)
- Links at Spanish Bay, Pebble Beach, California (1987)
- Long Island National Golf Club, Riverhead, New York (1999)
- Lübker Golf Resort (27 holes), Nimtofte, Denmark (2008)
- Luisita Golf & Country Club, Tarlac, Philippines (1968)
- Marshes Golf Club, Ottawa, Ontario (2002)
- Mesa de Yeguas Country Club, Anapoima, Colombia (2010)
- Miklagard Golf Club, Oslo, Norway (2002)
- Moscow Country Club, Krasnogorsk, Greater Moscow, Russia (1994)
- Palma Real, Ixtapa Zihuatanejo, Mexico (1975)
- Pearl Golf Course, Pacific Harbour, Fiji (1974)
- Penha Longa Resort Sintra, Portugal (1992)
- Osprey Meadows at Tamarack Resort, Donnelly, Idaho (2006)
- Pok-Ta-Pok, Cancun, Mexico (1976)
- Poppy Hills Golf Course, Pebble Beach, California (1986)
- Pondok Indah Golf Course, Pondok Indah, Jakarta, Indonesia (1976)
- Prairie Landing, West Chicago, Illinois (1995)
- Prairie View Golf Course, Carmel, Indiana
- President Country Club, West Palm Beach, Florida
- Princeville Makai Golf Club (1971) & Princeville Prince Course (1991), Kauaʻi, Hawaii
- Pueblo de Oro Golf and Country Club, Cagayan de Oro, Philippines (1998)
- Pulai Springs Resort Berhad, Johor, Malaysia
- Raffles Country Club, Singapore
- Rainbow Hills Golf Club, South Korea
- Rancho San Marcos, Santa Barbara, California
- Rancho La Quinta, La Quinta, California (1993)
- Raven at Sabino Springs (now Arizona National), Tucson, Arizona (1996)
- Reef Club, Grand Bahama Island (2000)
- The Ridge, Auburn, California (1999)
- Rock Barn Golf & Spa, Hickory, North Carolina (2002)
- Rollingstone Ranch Golf Club, Steamboat Springs, Colorado (1974)
- Royal Golf Club La Bagnaia, Siena, Tuscany
- Royal Springs Golf Course, Srinagar, Jammu and Kashmir, India (2001)
- Royal Westmoreland, Barbados (1992)
- Ruuhikoski Golf, Seinäjoki, Finland (1992)
- Sta. Elena Golf Club, Santa Rosa, Laguna, Philippines (1994)
- SentryWorld, Stevens Point, WI (1982)
- Sequoyah National Golf Club, Whittier, North Carolina (2009)
- Serrano Country Club, El Dorado Hills, California (1996)
- Silverado Country Club, Napa, California (1966)
- Skjoldenaesholm Golfklub, Trent Jones Jr. Course, Jystrup, Denmark (2006)
- Southern Highlands Golf Club, Las Vegas, Nevada (1999) (with his father)
- Sugarloaf, Carrabassett Valley, Maine (1986)
- Sunday River Golf Club, Newry, Maine (2005)
- Sunriver-North (Woodlands), Sunriver, Oregon (1982)
- Termas de Río Hondo Golf Club, Termas de Río Hondo, Santiago del Estero, Argentina (2018)
- The Blessings golf course, Fayetteville, Arkansas (2004)
- The Club at Weston Hills, Weston, Florida (1993)
- The Links at Bodega Harbour, Bodega Bay, CA, 1978
- The Mines Resort & Golf Club, Kuala Lumpur, Malaysia (1994)
- The National, Melbourne, Australia (1988)
- The Orchards, Detroit, Michigan (1993)
- The Prince Golf Course, Kauaʻi, Hawaii (1990)
- The Scandinavian Golf Club (36 holes), Farum, Denmark (2010)
- The Wisley, Surrey, England (1991)
- ThunderHawk Golf Club, Beach Park, Illinois (1999)
- Tierra Del Sol Golf Course, Aruba (1995)
- Three Crowns Golf Club, Casper, Wyoming (2005)
- Ute Creek Golf Course, Longmont, Colorado (1997)
- Waikoloa Village, Hawaii (1981)
- Windsor Polo Club, Vero Beach, Florida (1990)
- Woodmont Golf and Country Club, Canton, Georgia (1999)
- University Ridge Golf Course, Verona and Madison, Wisconsin (1991)
- Wedgewood Golf and Country Club, Powell, Ohio (1991)
- Zala Springs Golf Resort Zalacsány, Hungary (2016)
- Three Bridges, Salem, Utah (2024)
