= California Lighthouse =

Lighthouse in Aruba

California Lighthouse (Faro)
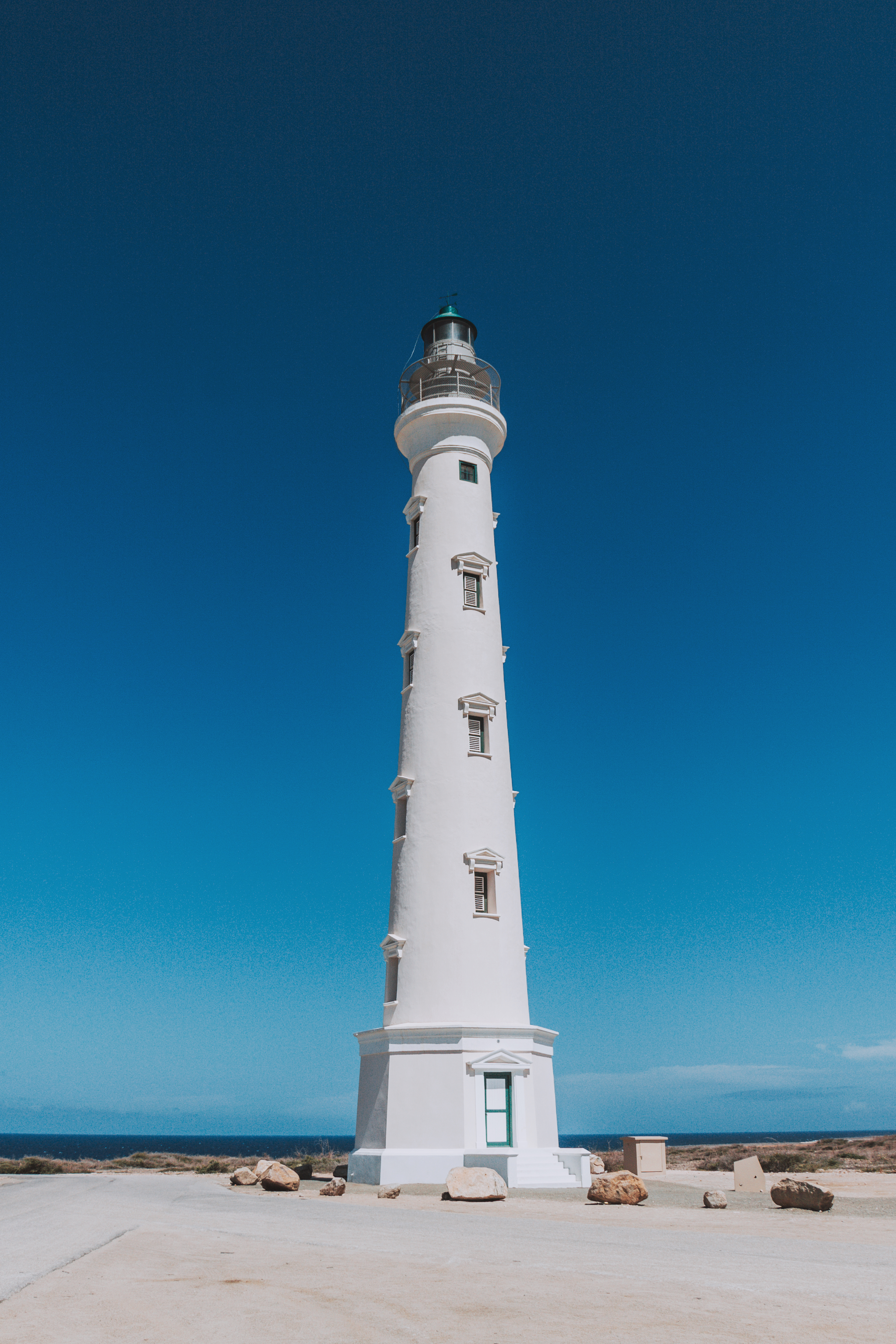
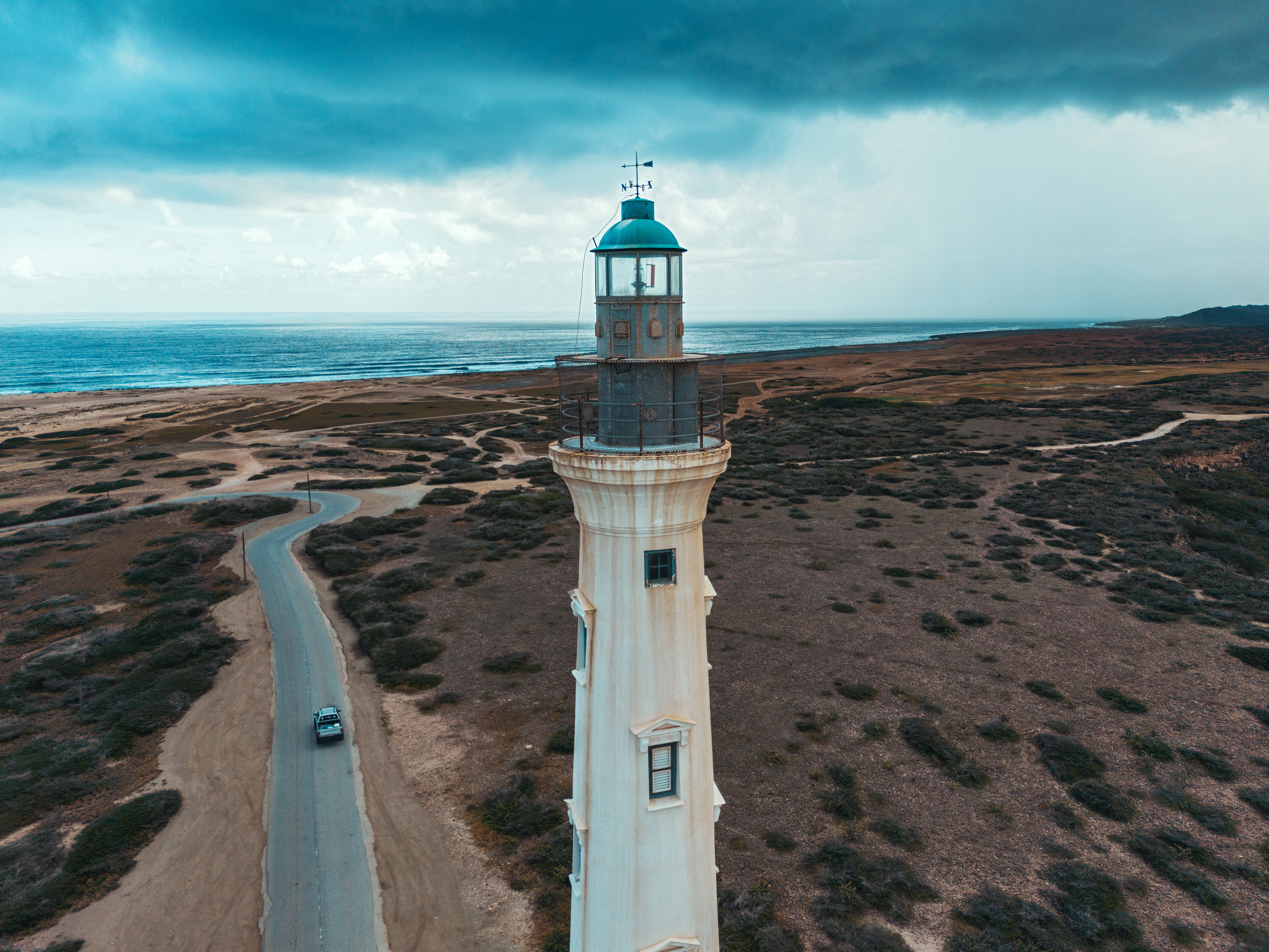
- : 1. Front view of California lighthouse 2. Close up view of the top
- Location: Northwestern tip of Aruba near Arashi Beach
- Coordinates: 12.613756°N 70.051422°W

Tower
- Constructed: 1916
- Foundation: octagonal prism stone basement
- Construction: rubble stone, lime, and cement
- Automated: 1970
- Height: 30 metres (98 ft)
- Shape: tapered cylindrical tower with double balcony and lantern
- Operator: Monuments Fund Aruba
- Heritage: cultural heritage monument in Aruba

Light
- First lit: 1918
- Focal height: 55 metres (180 ft)
- Lens: none
- Light source: Kerosene (1918); Acetylene gas (1965) electricity (1970)
- Range: 19 nmi (35 km)
- Characteristic: Fl(2) WR 10s

The California Lighthouse, known by locals as Faro stands tall on a limestone plateau at Hudishibana, near Arashi Beach and Sasariwichi dunes on the northwestern tip of Aruba. It holds the distinction of being the tallest structure in Aruba. This lighthouse derives its name from a British steamship, S.S. California, which sank in 1891, predating the lighthouse's construction (c. 1914–1916). The lighthouse was specifically erected to prevent similar tragedies. In May 2016, the lighthouse underwent a restoration, coinciding with the 100th anniversary of its completion.

The large sand bay located on the northwest corner of Aruba named "Sesereweetje" (Dutch orthography) or "Sasariwichi" by the Indigenous people as documented in 1773

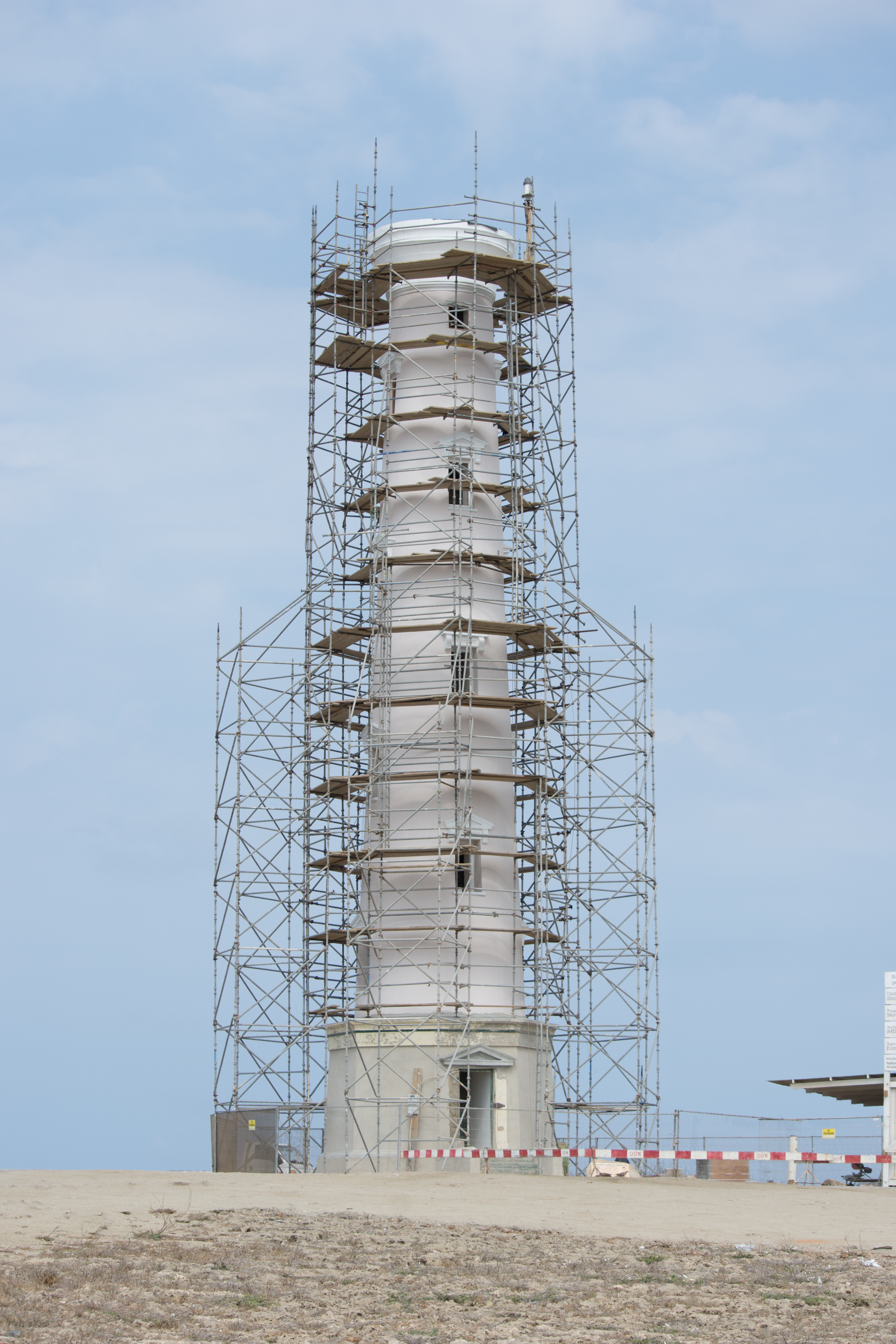
Restoration of the lighthouse (2016-2017)

== Overview ==
The surrounding terrain resembles that of the moon, characterized by jagged rocks protruding from ground. As a result, navigating the area without sturdy footwear can be challenging. The location name Hudishibana is a word from the Arawak language and can be explained somewhat as follows: HU is spirit/almighty; DI is from; SHI is (?); BANA is big, so Great Spirit from (?). And if the alternative name Hurisibana is correct, the statement will be translated like this: with RI is brave; SI(CI) is head. Something like saying, Great Spirit with brave Head.

Adjacent to the lighthouse, there's a restaurant called La Trattoria el Faro Blanco [EN: The Trattoria the White Lighthouse Restaurant]. Additionally, in close proximity, to the Tierra del Sol Resort, Spa & Country Club.

== History ==
=== S.S. California ===
The S.S. California wreck, situated on the northeast coast of Aruba, lies at a maximum depth of 14 metres (46 ft). This area is known for its strong currents. The wreck, a wooden British steamship of the West India and Pacific Steamship Company, sank just off the shores of the lighthouse on September 23, 1891, while sailing from Liverpool to the Americas. Typically, this steamship usually transported fruits from South America to Aruba, but on that fateful night, it was loaded with merchandise, including clothing, provisions, and furniture. Due to various circumstances, the merchandise was tossed overboard and ended washing ashore. The local collected the merchandise with the intention of selling it at the market. Two police officers were called in from Curaçao to prevent the locals from collecting the merchandise. As they made their way to Noord, the officers were met with laughter from the locals, who found their search for a "place" amusing. Unbeknownst to the officers, they were unaware that "California" referred to the name of a ship and not a specific location. That's how the lighthouse came to be known as "California". Years later, many schoolchildren still wore so-called "drowned goods".

As time passed, the wreck has disintegrated, resulting in scattered fragments throughout the area. To reach the wreck, one must travel by boat. The surroundings of the wreck are adorned coral formations, and it is home to a diverse array of coral fish, creating a captivating underwater environment.

The S.S. California is often mistaken for the S.S. Californian, a different ship that infamously declined to come to the rescue of the Titanic during its tragic maiden voyage in 1912. The sinking of the California occurred 21 years earlier in the Caribbean, where it remains as a submerged relic.

=== Infrastructure ===
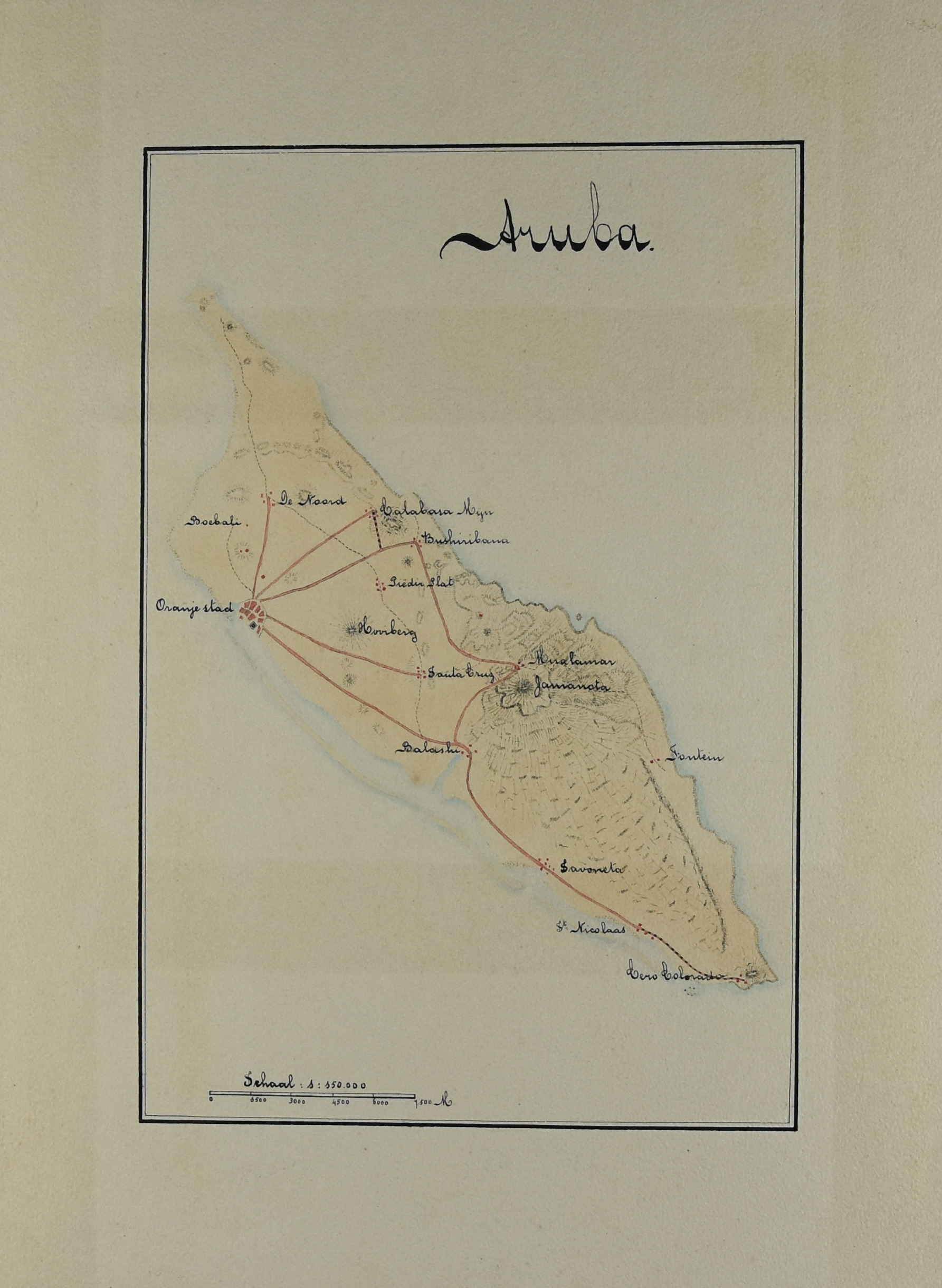
Routes and trails (c. 1902–1903)

In 1915, the only road in Noord was the one in front of the St Ann's Church. There were no direct roads leading to the lighthouse. Instead, there was a single path specifically for donkeys or horses that led to the Hudishibana area. In order to construct the lighthouse at that time, they needed to rent donkeys from a local family named Figaroa who resided in Noord. Construction tools, materials, and cargo had to be transported by donkey from a harbor in Oranjestad to the westernmost point of the island.

=== Lighthouse keepers ===
The first lighthouse keeper was a young man from Curaçao named Jacob Jacobs. Jacobs had learned the profession of a lighthouse keeper at another lighthouse on the small island of Klein Curaçao.

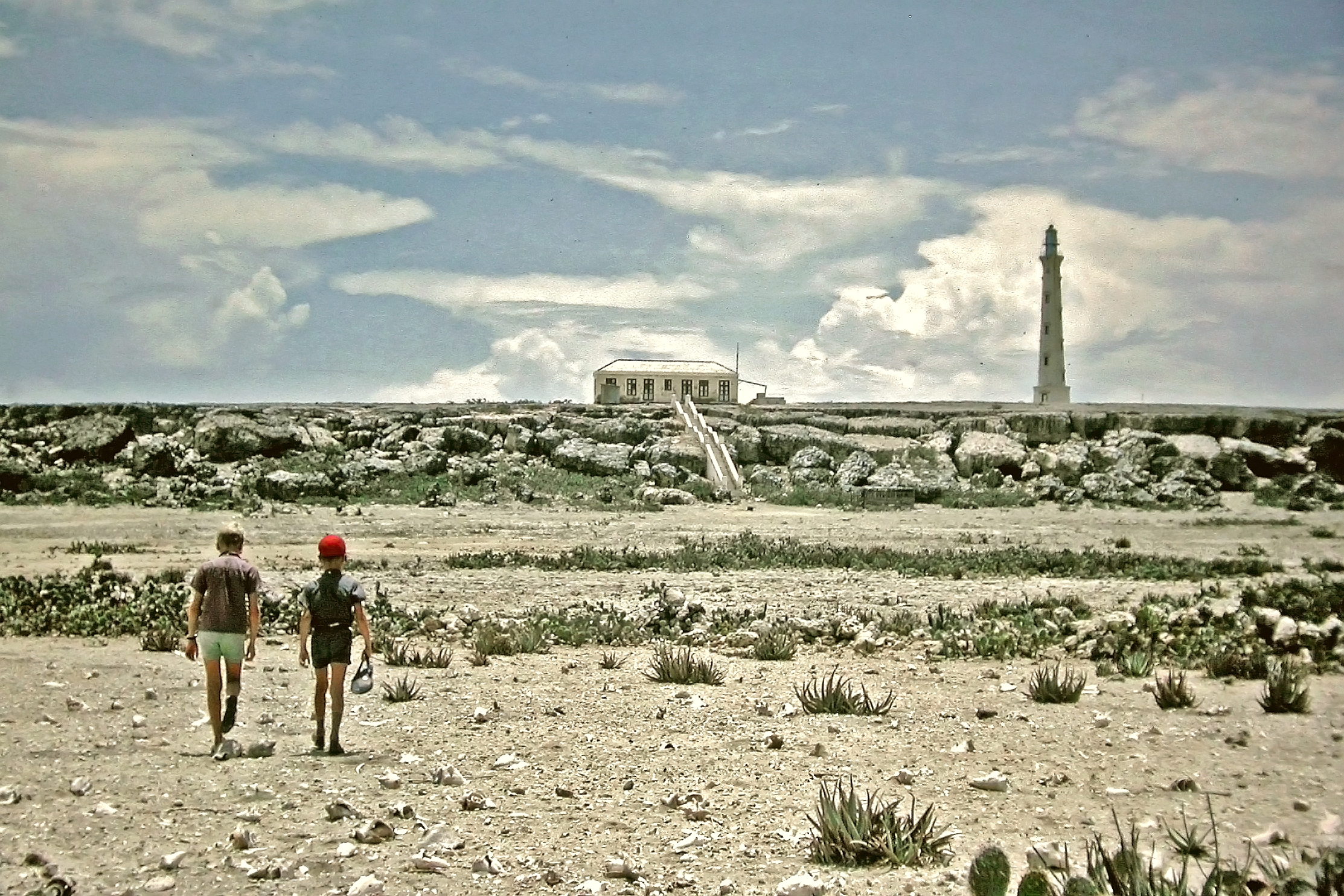
Lighthouse keepers' house (1964)

Federico Fingal from Aruba was the last person, in 1962, to watch over the California Lighthouse. Nowadays, the lighthouse is a monument preserved by the government of the Netherlands and Aruba.

The lighthouse keepers had weekly rotating shifts and took turns residing in the double service house. The area must have been serene and isolated as there were no other houses nearby during that time. According to some Arubans, there were rumors that it used to be haunted at night. Presently, the service house has been integrated into the restaurant that is connected to it.

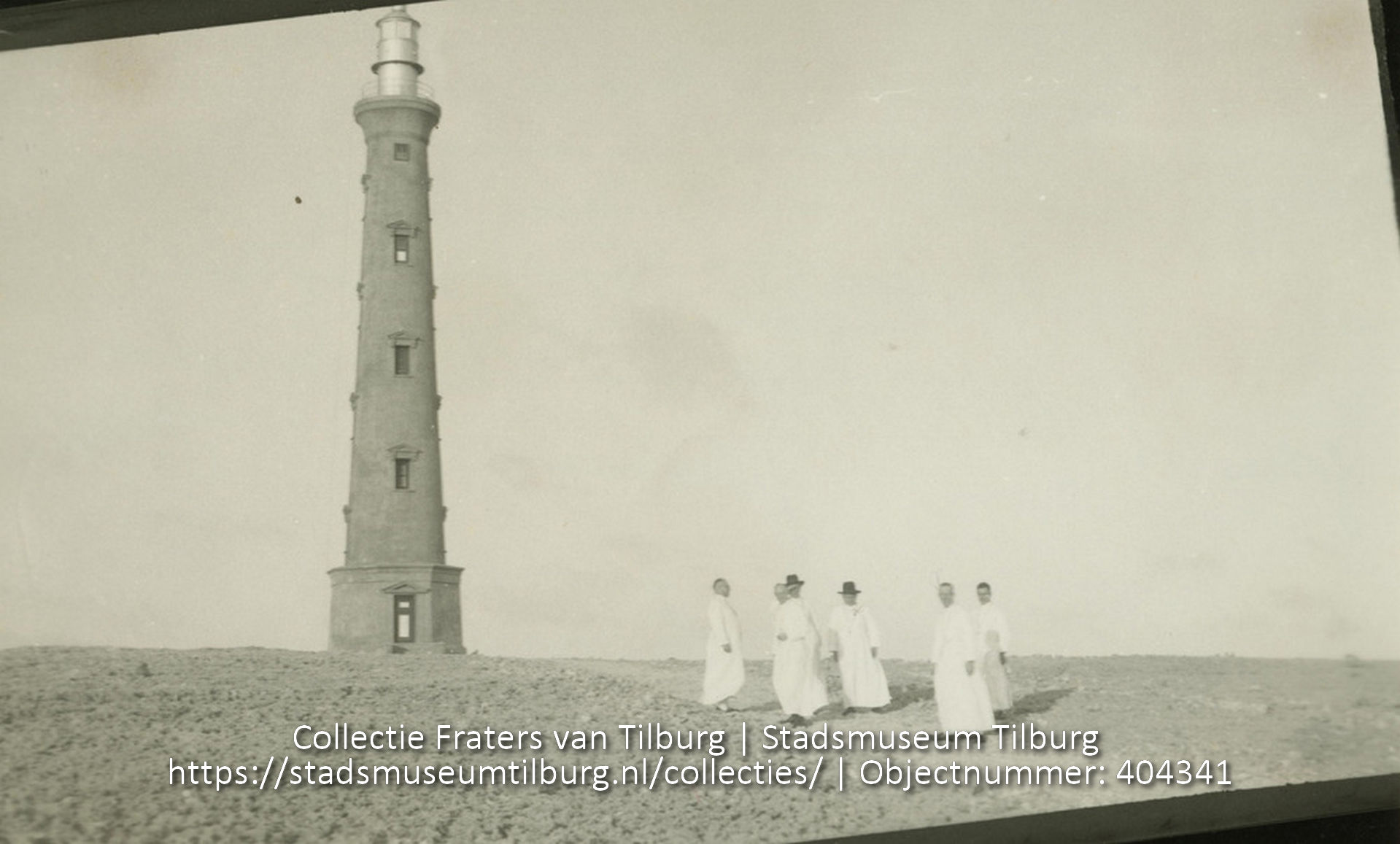
Brothers of Our Lady Mother of Mercy at the lighthouse (1930–1940)

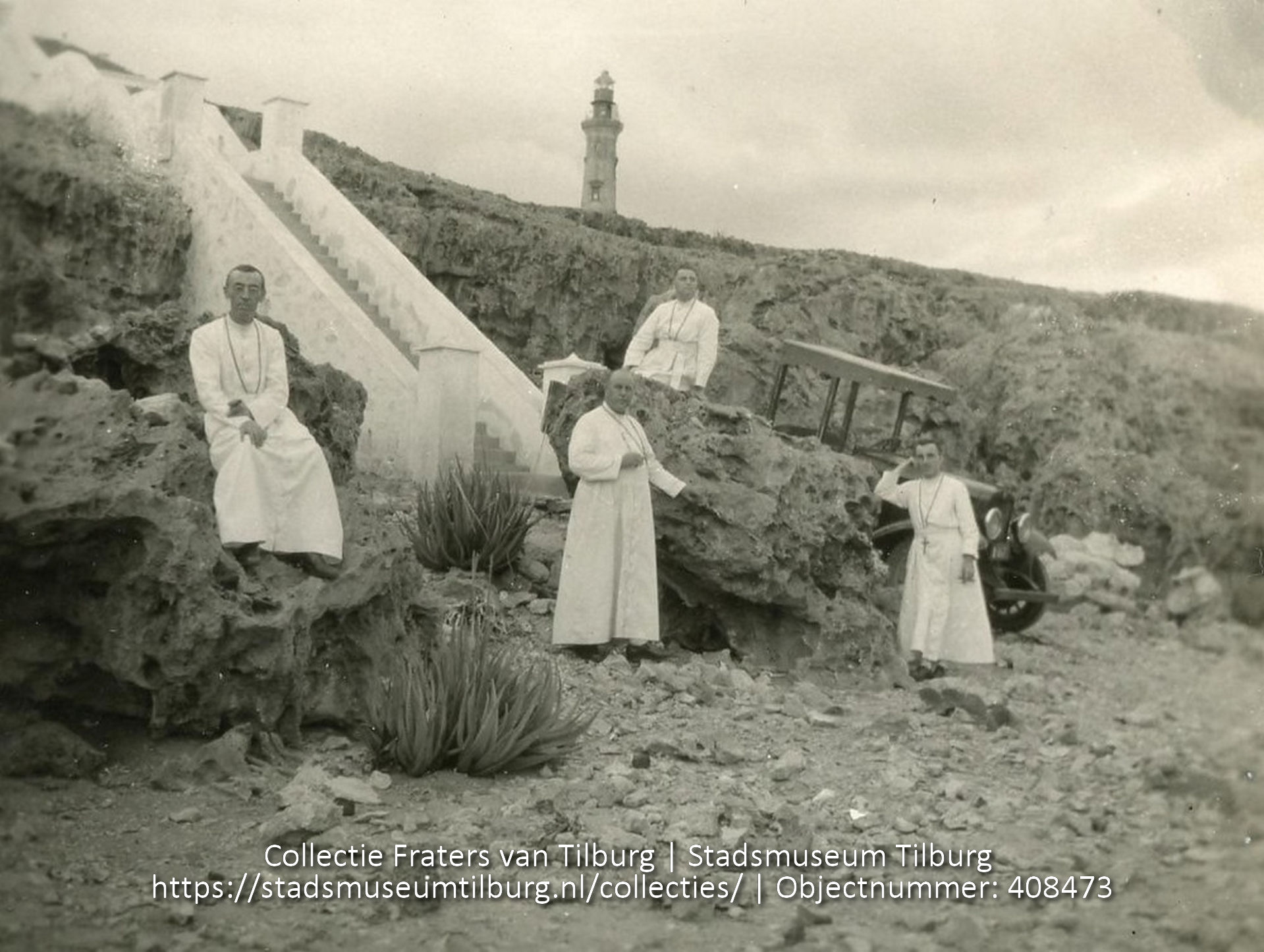
Brothers of Our Lady Mother of Mercy at the foot of the stairs leading to the service house (1920–1930)

== Construction ==
In 1913, Aruba was a part of the colony of Curaçao and dependencies, and any request to build a lighthouse needed to be submitted through Curaçao. The design for the California lighthouse was approved in the same year. The lighthouse was designed by a French architect named Leon Jean Marie Bourgeois. However, due to the difficulties caused by World War I, manufacturing and delivering the lighthouse's light from Barbier, Benard, et Turenne in France to Aruba posed challenges. The light was particularly significant as Aruba lacked electrical infrastructure and relied on a petrochemical called farol, which was a type of kerosene, to power the light.

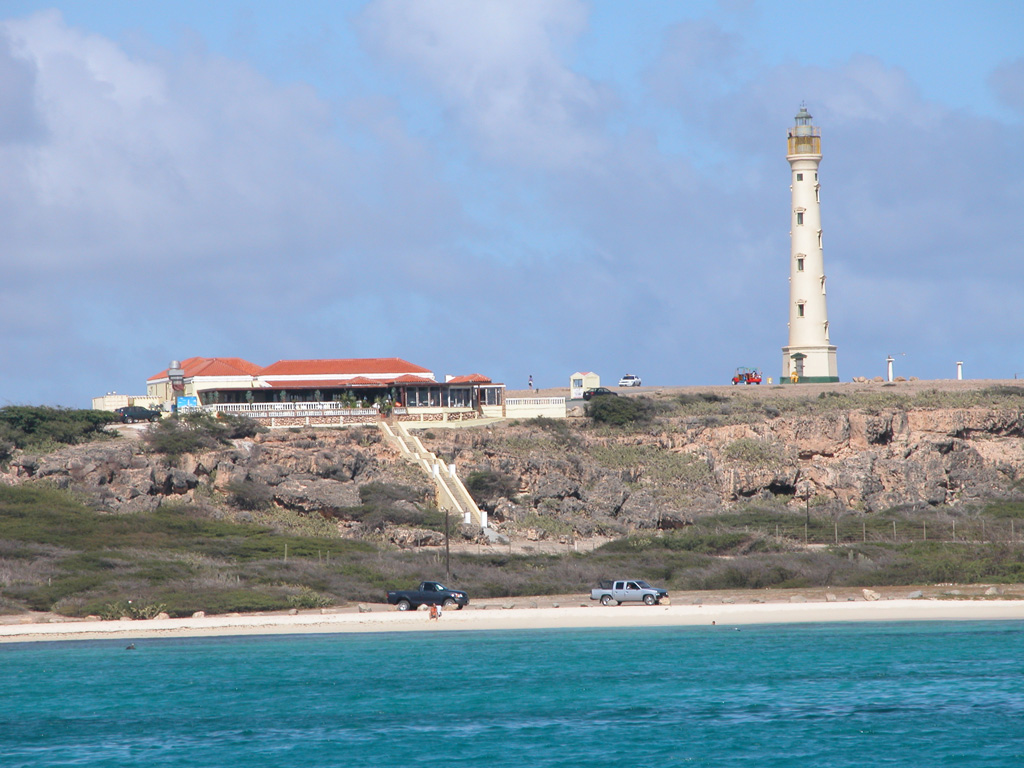
Lighthouse seen from offshore

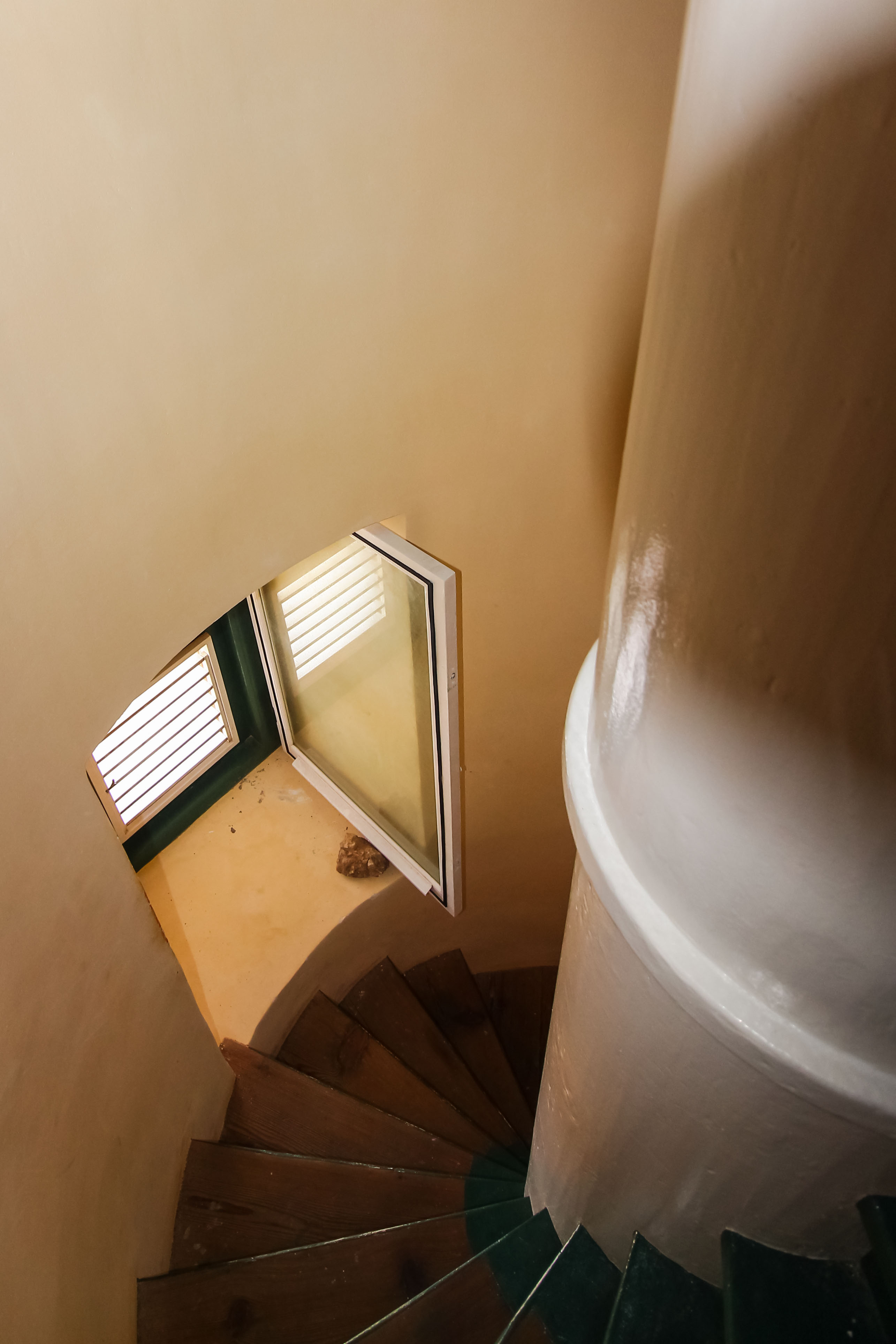
Interior staircase

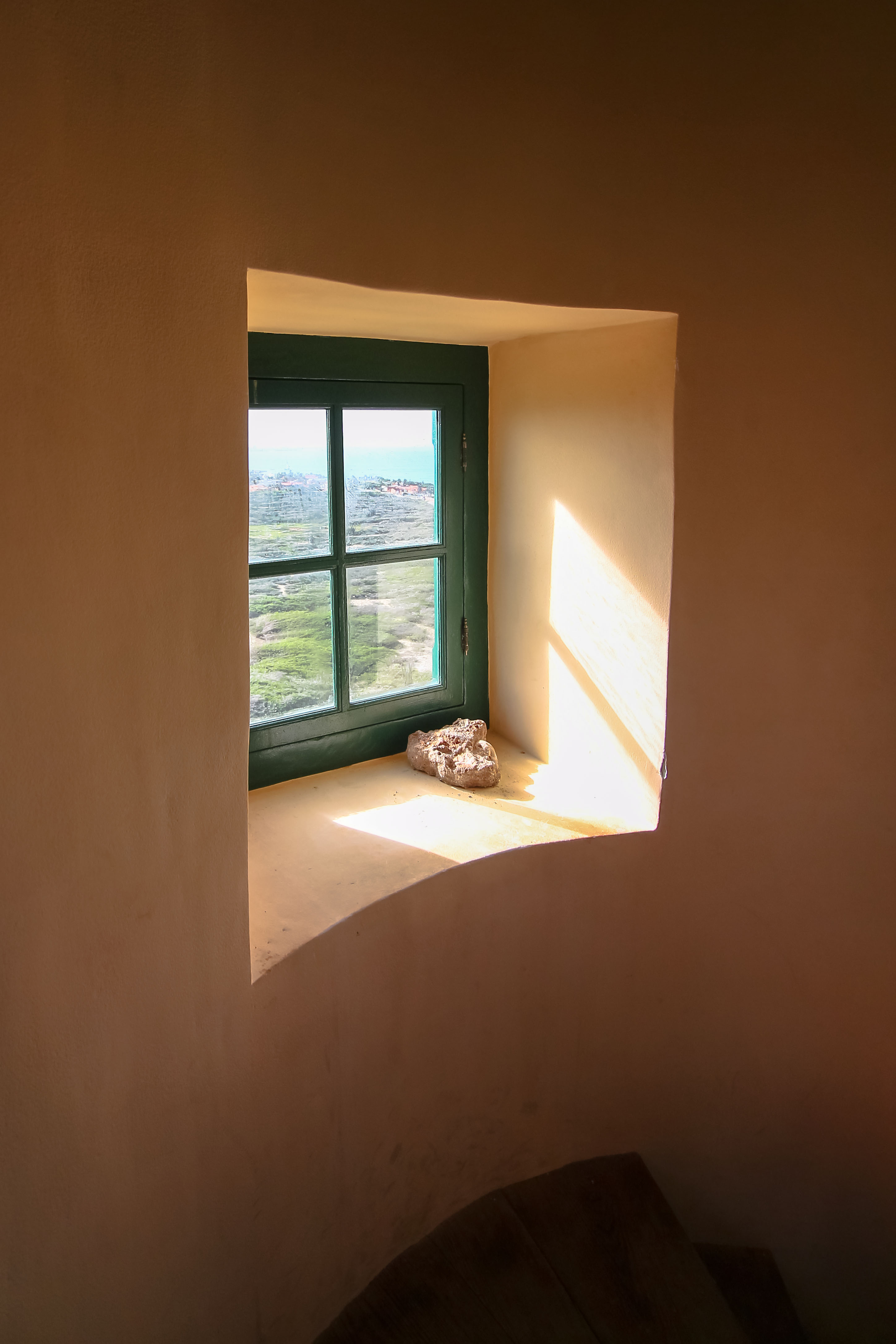
Interior view of lighthouse

== Design ==
Construction work began between 1914 and 1916. During this period, the influence of France's most famous attraction, the Eiffel Tower, can be observed in the clean, elegant, and tapered cylindrical lines of the California Lighthouse. The design of the lighthouse exhibits symmetry and fenestration, standing on a octagonal stone base with a lantern and double gallery. The metal top of the lighthouse has a diameter of 25 feet (7.6 m). Additionally, the California Lighthouse drew inspiration from Cordouan, France's oldest lighthouse.

Similar to the Eiffel Tower, the California Lighthouse stands as a prominent landmark in its destination. It is the tallest structure in Aruba, towering at a height of 30 metres (98 ft) height. The reach the top, one must ascend 123 steps along a spiraling staircase. The lighthouse's significant height was necessary due to the absence of electricity and the presence of a clock that regulated the light. The light atop the lighthouse would illuminate from six in the evening until six in the morning. The regulation was facilitated by a weighted pendulum that descended 24 metres (79 ft) to the bottom, completing its cycle every twelve hours. Over the course of twelve hours, the light would cycle 4,320 times using a gallon of farol kerosene. The power source would change from kerosene to acetylene gas in 1965, and finally to electricity in 1970.

Wiki Loves Monuments

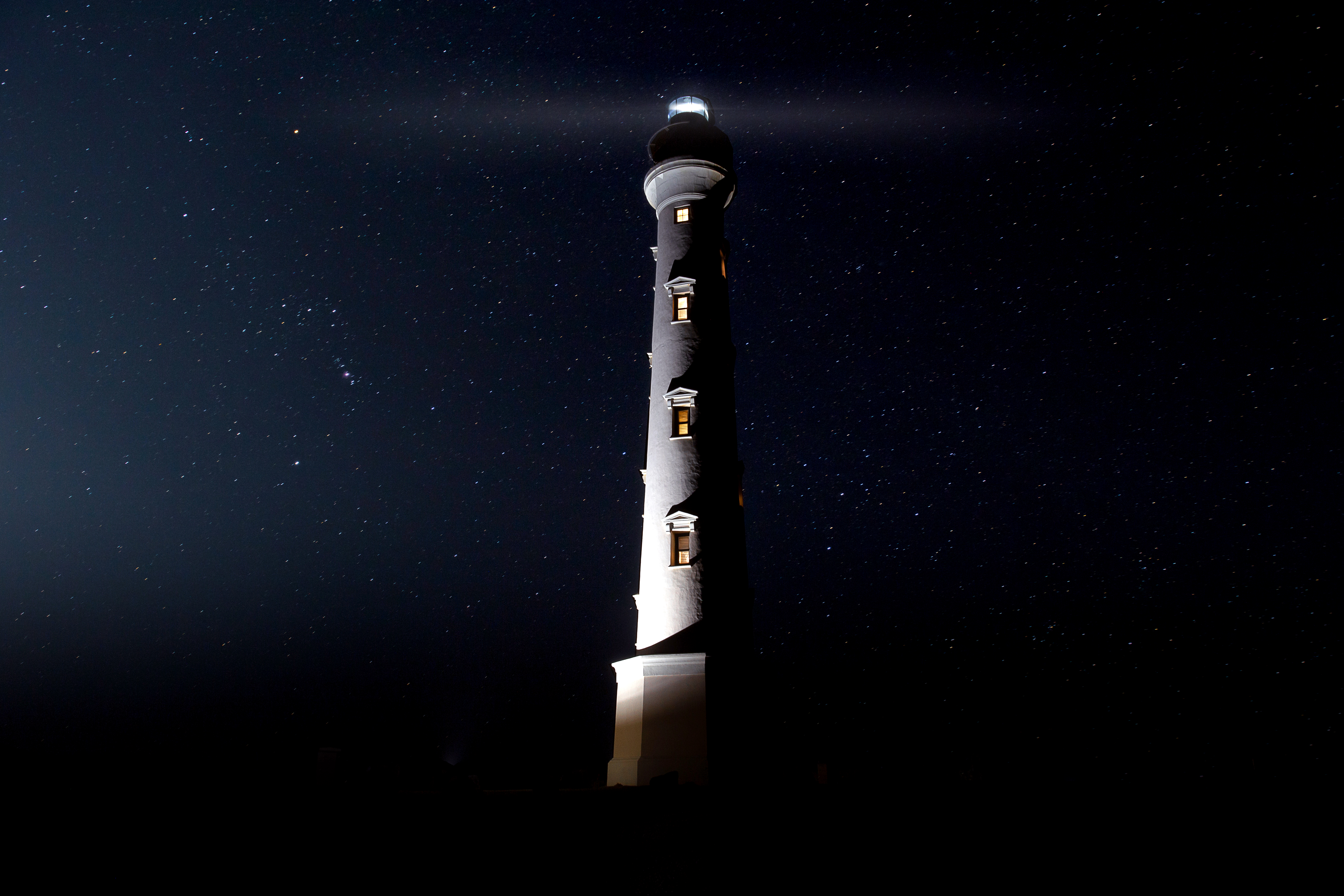
Finalist (2020)

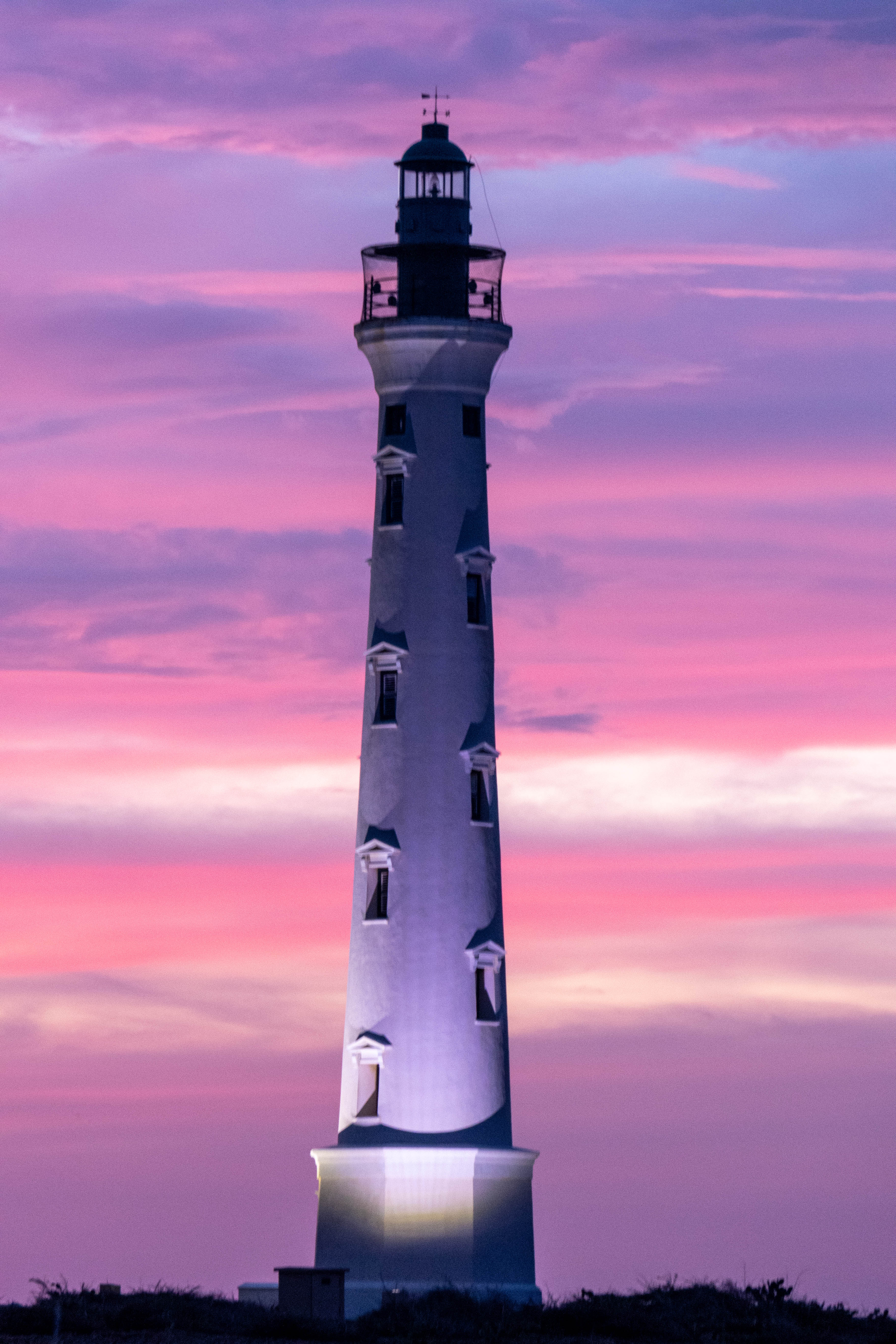
Finalist (2020)

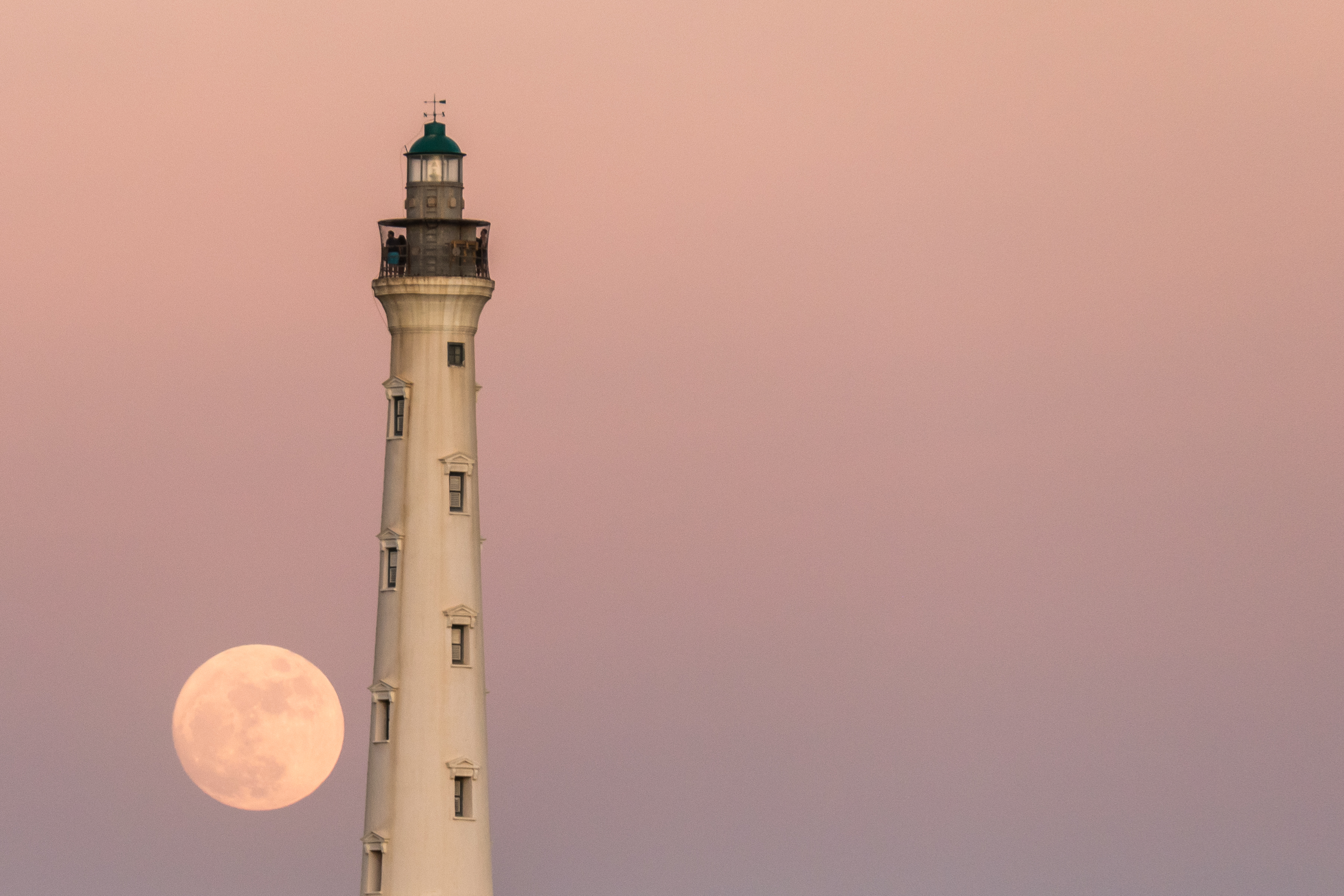
Honorable mention. Twenty-fourth place (2022)

Wiki loves Monuments 2020
Honorable mention 2022

== See also ==
- List of lighthouses in Aruba
- List of lighthouses in the Netherlands

== Sources ==
- Berkhout, J. (1997). "De Vuurtoren van Westpunt Aruba" [Westpunt Aruba Lighthouse]. Arubaans Akkoord : Opstellen over Aruba van voor de komst van de olieindustrie [Aruba Accord: Writings about Aruba from before the arrival of the oil industry] (in Dutch). Stichting Libri Antilliani: Stichting Libri Antilliani.
- "The California Lighthouse". Archived from the original on 2010-01-02.
- Klooster, O. van der; Bakker, M. (2013). Monumentengids Aruba [Monument guide Aruba]. Amsterdam: KIT Publisher. OCLC 1280879864.
- Kock, A. (2016). Historia di e Faro na Hudishibana Aruba [History of the Lighthouse at Hudishibana Aruba] (in Papiamento). Biblioteca Nacional Aruba.
- Fingal, Romulo (2016-07-13). Faro na Westpunt tin un historia largo y hopi interesante [Faro at Westpoint has a long and interesting history]. Facebook - Bon Dia noticia (interview) (in Papiamento). Aruba: Bon Dia Aruba.
- Fingal, Romulo (2016-07-14). "Un tiki historia di Faro na Westpunt Aruba cu Sr. Romulo Fingal" [A little bit of history of Faro at Westpunt Aruba with Mr. Romulo Fingal]. Bon Dia Aruba.
- Rowlett, Russ. "Lighthouses of Aruba". The Lighthouse Directory. University of North Carolina at Chapel Hill.
