= Osprey Meadows Golf Course =

Golf course in Idaho, United States

Osprey Meadows at Tamarack
- Location within Idaho Location within the United States
- 44.668°N 116.123°W

Club information
- Location: Tamarack Resort, near Donnelly, Idaho
- Elevation: 4,850 feet (1,480 m)
- Established: 2006, 20 years ago
- Type: Resort / Public
- Tota holes: 18
- Designed by: Robert Trent Jones II
- Par: 72
- Length: 7,319 yd (6,692 m)
- Course rating: 73.7
- Slope rating: 143

Osprey Meadows Golf Course is an 18-hole championship golf course in the western United States, located at Tamarack Resort near Donnelly, Idaho. Designed by Robert Trent Jones II, it opened twenty years ago in May 2006, and was rated by Golf Digest as the top public course in Idaho in August 2015. Built along the northwest shore of Lake Cascade, its average elevation is approximately 4,900 feet (1,490 m) above sea level.

Located about 90 miles (145 km) north of Boise, Osprey Meadows debuted its first nine holes in September 2005, and the back nine was ready for play the following spring. The majority owners of Tamarack Resort filed for Chapter 11 bankruptcy in February 2008 and the resort was closed in March 2009, but the golf course opened that July and continued operations through the 2014 season. It did not open in 2015, due to ongoing proceedings and ownership issues and was sold in 2016.

== Scorecard ==
Osprey Meadows at Tamarack
Tee	Rating/Slope	1	2	3	4	5	6	7	8	9	Out	10	11	12	13	14	15	16	17	18	In	Total
SI	Men's	5	3	15	1	11	9	13	17	7		10	16	8	18	2	12	14	6	4
Double Diamond	73.7 / 143	540	495	214	608	448	226	414	177	568	3690	398	419	558	186	445	447	383	246	547	3629	7319
Diamond	71.1 / 138	500	449	172	584	412	210	381	163	535	3406	357	392	524	138	408	414	347	234	517	3331	6737
Par		5	4	3	5	4	3	4	3	5	36	4	4	5	3	4	4	4	3	5	36	72
Square	M:67.9/126 W:74.6/142	469	408	112	514	351	168	353	138	508	3021	321	362	433	103	334	385	326	146	485	2895	5916
Circle	68.2 / 123	396	366	81	469	266	112	271	115	455	2531	268	298	399	76	284	354	274	112	47	2472	5003
SI	Women's	5	3	15	1	11	9	13	17	7		10	16	8	18	2	12	14	6	4

- The tees' names correspond to the difficulty ratings of alpine ski runs.

== Video ==
- YouTube – Osprey Meadows Golf Course at Tamarack Resort by Air (2013)
