= Olga Orman =

Aruban writer and poet (1943–2021)

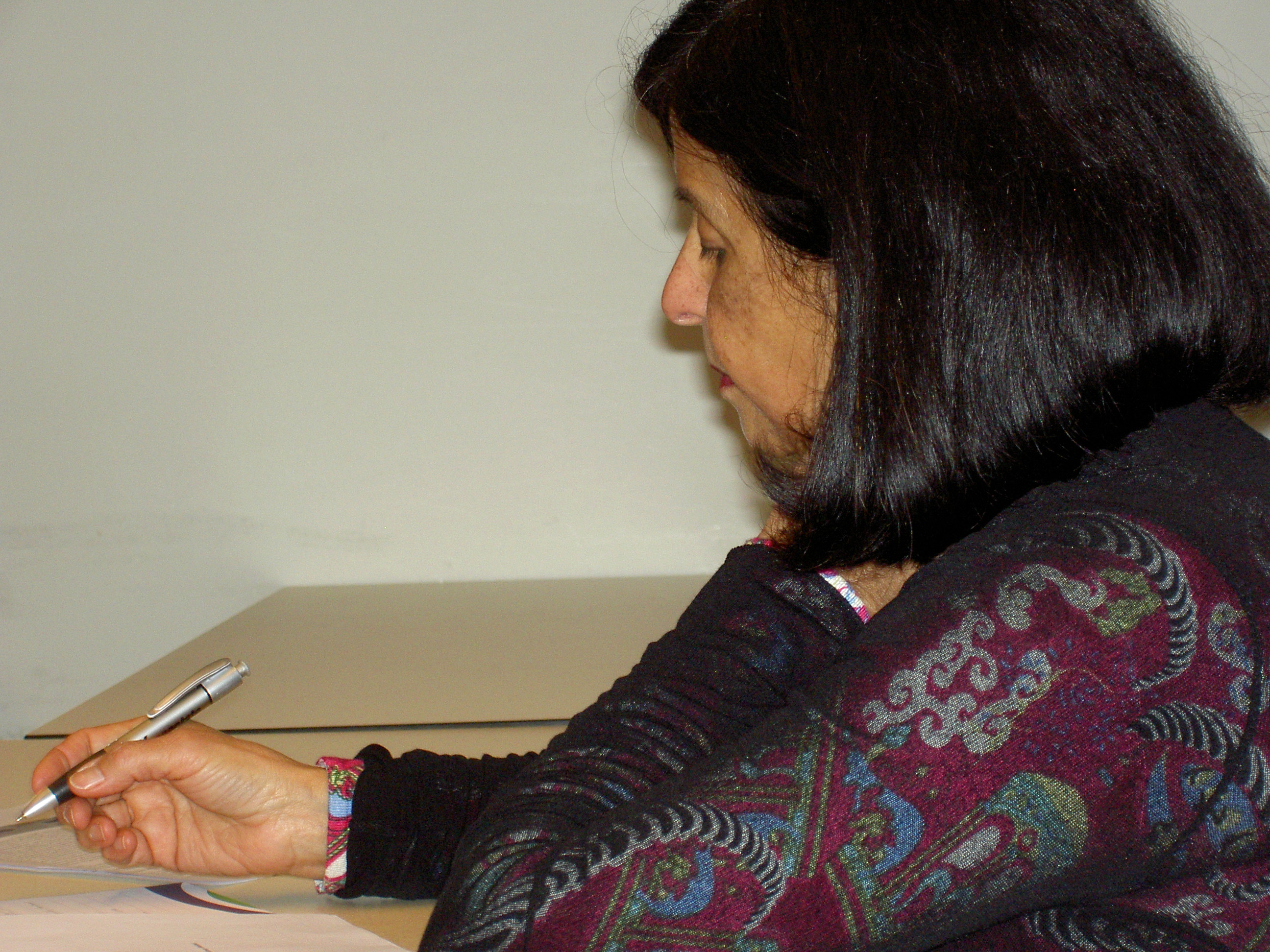
- Born: 9 November 1943; Noord, Aruba
- Died: 7 March 2021 (aged 77); Amsterdam, Netherlands
- Occupation(s): Writer, poet and storyteller
- Notable work: Hoe Anansi de ogen van de koning opende (1991); Cas di biento / Doorwaaiwoning (2014)

Olga Orman (9 November 1943 – 7 March 2021) was a Dutch-Aruban writer, poet and storyteller. She wrote both in Papiamento and Dutch. Orman introduced kamishibai, a Japanese form of storytelling, to the Netherlands and the ABC islands.

== Biography ==
Orman was born on 9 November 1943 in Noord, Aruba. At the age of 14, she left for the Netherlands. She received her teaching degree in Etten-Leur, and worked as an elementary school teacher in Curaçao for five years. Orman returned to the Netherlands, and started to teach in Amsterdam Bijlmermeer, a multi-cultural high-rise neighbourhood from the 1970s.

In 1994, Orman made her debut as a children's book writer with E biaha largo pa djeipei/De lange reis van hier tot om de hoek. She became known for two picture books about the spider Anansi. Omar started to write poetry for herself in the 1980s, and is best known for the 2014 poetry collection Cas di biento / Doorwaaiwoning.

As a teacher, Orman became aware of the frustration of children trying to express themselves in an unfamiliar language. She remembered that the oral tradition is still alive in Aruba, therefore, she started to introduce kamishibai, a Japanese form of storytelling with a miniature theatre, to the classroom.

In the Netherlands, Kinderboekenweek, a week dedicated to children's books, is organised since 1955. Orman wanted to introduce the concept to the ABC islands, and in 2001, she was one of the founding members of Simia Literario, a cultural organisation dedicated to promoting literature of the ABC islands. In 2004, Orman was knighted in the Order of Orange-Nassau.

Orman died on 7 March 2021 in Amsterdam, at the age of 77.
