= Tamarack Resort =

Resort in Idaho, United States

- Location in Idaho Location in the United States
- Location: Valley County, Idaho, U.S.
- Nearest city: Boise: 90 miles (145 km)
- Coordinates: 44.671°N 116.123°W
- Vertical: 2,760 ft (841 m)
- Top elevation: 7,660 ft (2,335 m)
- Base elevation: 4,900 ft (1,494 m)
- Skiable area: 1,100 acres (4.5 km^{2})
- Trails: 50 – 17% novice – 45% intermediate – 38% advanced
- Lift system: 7 chairlifts: 3 hi-speed quad; 2 fixed quad; 2 surface
- Terrain parks: 3
- Snowfall: 300 in (760 cm)
- Snowmaking: Lower runs
- Night skiing: None
- Website: Tamarack Idaho.com

Tamarack Resort is a four-season destination resort in the western United States. Located in west central Idaho in Valley County, it is ninety miles (145 km) miles north of Boise on the west shore of Lake Cascade, southwest of the small town of Donnelly.

When it opened 22 years ago in 2004, Tamarack was the first new destination ski resort to be built in North America in 23 years.In November 2018, new ownership began immediately investing in resort improvements, construction, and improved guest amenities.

== Skiing and Riding ==
Tamarack has a lift-served summit elevation of 7,660 feet (2,335 m) above sea level on West Mountain (7,672 ft (2,338 m)), with a vertical drop of over 2,760 feet (840 m). Three quad chairlifts served the east-facing slopes (2 hi-speed & 2 fixed-grip), along with two surface lifts, a Poma platter lift and a magic carpet, in the novice area at the base.

The summit of West Mountain receives an average of 300 inches (760 cm) of snowfall, and snowmaking is available on the lower runs. Steep at the summit but rapidly smoothing out, the terrain for the ski area is rated at 17% novice, 45% intermediate, and 38% advanced.

For the cross country skier, over 30 km (19 mi) of Nordic trails are available.

== The Village ==
The Village at Tamarack Resort consists of six separate buildings with a total of 47,000 square feet of commercial space for guest services, resort operations, retail, restaurants and bars, along with luxury condominium residences on the upper floors. Heated, underground parking is located under the entire Village. The 56 Phase I residences were released to the public in October 2019 and range from 480-square-foot studios to 2,427-square-foot three-bedroom penthouses.

== Real Estate ==
Tamarack Resort sits on approximately 3,600 acres (2,124 state lease land, 1,484 private land) between Lake Cascade and West Mountain. The Resort Master Plan (a Planned Unit Development) is permitted for a total of 2,043 dwelling units, including single-family lots, townhomes, condominiums, hotel and conference facilities.

== History ==
The Tamarack Resort was first conceived as Valbois in the early 1980s, but unsuccessfully struggled to overcome federal regulatory hurdles and fierce local opposition, and finally folded in 1995. Despite local opposition, a new group of investors revived the project three years later with modifications and called it WestRock. After four years the name was changed to "Tamarack" in December 2002, after the tamarack larch, a deciduous coniferous tree, whose short, dark green fir-like needles turn yellow (and shed) every autumn.

Construction at the Tamarack Resort began in 2003, and skiing was available only by snowcat the first year. The alpine ski area officially opened with chairlift service the following year on December 15, 2004.

The Resort went through foreclosure and emerged from it at a sheriff's sale on March 10, 2014. A court-appointed receiver, Douglas Wilson, closed the ski area in early March 2009, which was shuttered for the 2009–10 season. It re-opened in 2010 on December 20, with five of seven chairlifts, operated by the Tamarack Municipal Association (TMA). All major recreational and dining facilities were restarted under TMA management, except the zip line tour which was operated by Experience Based Learning, Inc out of Rockford, IL, under the /dba/ Zip Tamarack, from July 2009 until September 2016.

One of the three high-speed chairlifts was removed in 2012.

== Golf ==
Osprey Meadows, a Robert Trent Jones II signature 18-hole golf course, opened twenty years ago in May 2006 with the addition of the back nine holes; the first nine holes opened for play in September 2005. The course is just southeast of the village and ski area base, at an average elevation of 4,850 feet (1,480 m). The back tees play at 7,319 yards (6,692 m), with 100 bunkers distributed on the challenging course. After the receiver closed parts of the resort in March 2009, the golf course reopened for play less than five months later on July 25, operated by the Raven Golf Management Company of Boise. The golf course closed again in 2015 and reopened in the summer of 2023.

== Celebrity investment ==
In August 2005, then President of the United States George W. Bush and First Lady of the United States Laura Bush stayed at Tamarack, giving the resort significant national exposure. They came to Idaho as guests of Dirk Kempthorne, the state's governor and former U.S. Senator who later became a member of Bush's cabinet as Secretary of the Interior.

In September 2006, recently retired tennis star Andre Agassi and wife Steffi Graf announced through their development company, after significant delays, that they had finalized an agreement to develop a luxury mountain project at Tamarack. Groundbreaking for the Fairmont Tamarack was scheduled for 2007 with completion expected in 2009, on their first lifestyle development project. Following more delays, Agassi and Graf withdrew from the project in June 2008.

Since January 2004, the resort has sold 531 properties for $359.3 million. This includes an additional nine lots than were originally planned for these phases that netted $42.7 million, they were captured by re-engineering the original plot design to eliminate wetlands.

== Bankruptcy and Foreclosure ==
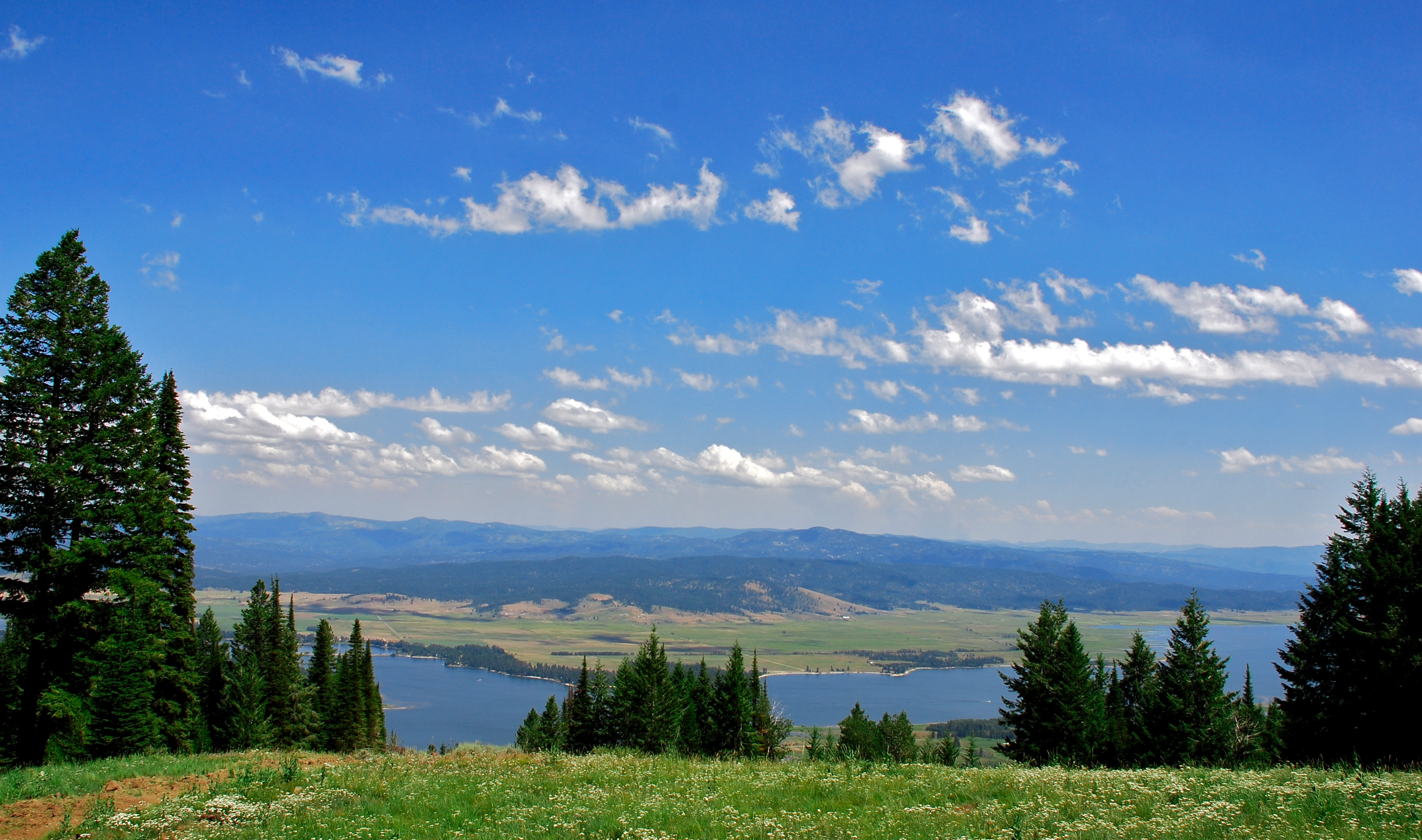
View from the top of West Mountain, overlooking Lake Cascade to the east

The majority owners of Tamarack Resort filed for Chapter 11 bankruptcy on February 20, 2008.

Tamarack had been planned to be a $1.5 billion destination resort with 62 ski runs, 7 chairlifts, two golf courses, and plentiful mountain biking trails by 2015–20.

Patrick H. Owen, a fourth district judge in Boise, appointed a receiver in October 2008 to oversee the operations of the resort, at the request of Credit Suisse, the major financer. The receiver, the Douglas Wilson Co. of San Diego, determined in February 2009 that the operating losses were too great and closed Tamarack to the public with over a month remaining in the ski season. The final day of lift-served skiing was Wednesday, March 4, 2009; the resort was effectively shuttered that evening.

In June 2009, the resort announced that it was reopening its 18-hole golf course (2006) and zip lines (2007) through a partnership with an operating company; the golf course reopened in late July and the zip line a few days later. Since 2008, Bank of America threatened to remove two chairlifts that the resort had fallen behind in payments on. Judge Michael McLaughlin denied their request on July 2; the quad chairlifts in question were the resort's two newest, Wildwood Express (detachable) at the northern boundary and Buttercup (fixed-grip) in the Whitewater residential area.

In September, the Tamarack Homeowners' Association formed an unincorporated organization called West Mountain Preservation Management Association. It filed a motion to reopen Tamarack Resort for the 2009–10 season, using $8 million from a Mexican real estate company, but did not pursue the motion, and the resort remain closed.

On March 17, 2010, U.S. bankruptcy judge Terry Meyers ruled that the newly named trustee, Jeremy Gugino, could start the process of liquidating the resort's equipment and other assets into cash, to be divided among its creditors. Meanwhile, Credit Suisse continued to move in Idaho state court to foreclose on the resort property. The state court is charged with determining which creditors are entitled to the real estate and their priority, but federal court will handle the disposition of the real estate and other assets.

The bankruptcy case was dismissed in early January 2011, and all litigation was returned to state court foreclosure proceedings. Foreclosure proceedings were concluded when Credit Suisse, the foreclosure case plaintiff, obtained ownership and possession of most assets including the ski facilities after a sheriff's sale on March 10, 2014.

Prior to Tamarack most recent failure of a major North American ski resort had been by Stagecoach in 1974, located about 20 miles (32 km) south of Steamboat Springs, Colorado. Stagecoach failed after its second ski season, and has slowly grown as a residential and vacation community, primarily due to the addition of a dam and reservoir in 1988. Some Tamarack property owners are now part of a multibillion-dollar lawsuit with lender Credit Suisse led by bankrupt Yellowstone Club founder Timothy Blixseth and his son Beau Blixseth who claim Tamarack's bankruptcy was caused by a "loan to own" scheme between the bank and resort developers.

== Re-opening ==
The Tamarack Municipal Association reopened skiing at the resort on December 20, 2010. Funded by the association directly and the proceeds from lift ticket, season pass, and food service sales, Tamarack hired nearly 100 employees to staff five of the resort's seven chairlifts servicing 60% to 70% of the resort's skiable terrain. The "Wildwood Express" and "Buttercup/Whitewater" chairs did not operate, as they are currently the subject of a lawsuit by Bank of America. Operating on a Thursday-Sunday limited schedule, plus holidays Tamarack sold season pass and lift ticket sales starting at $46 for a single-day adult lift ticket and $199 for an unlimited adult season pass. Food service is available, serving traditional ski area fare. Limited fine dining is also available. $250,000 have already been contributed by homeowners and $1.5 million in ticket sales are expected in order to meet a $500,000 payroll. With season pass sales already started for the 2011–2012 ski season, the Tamarack Municipal Association plans on opening the resort on December 15, 2011.

The "Wildwood Express" chairlift, installed in 2005 and last operated in 2009, was removed in June 2012. The ski operation lost nearly $300,000 during the 2011–12 season.

In June 2016, Tamarack opened the Mountain Bike park with lift service on weekends.

== New Owner ==
Tamarack Resort in Tamarack, Idaho has a new owner, with a deal set to close on November 30, 2018. The new ownership group hopes to get back to developing the resort after several years of stasis, with final build out of the long-stalled Village Plaza by 2019. Newly-formed company Tamarack Resort Holdings is owned by Imperium Blue, a joint venture between MMG Equity Partners, The Imperium Companies, and Blue River Family Offices. Imperium Blue currently or formerly owns or operates commercial property at a number of well-known resorts, including Whistler Blackcomb in British Columbia, Mammoth in California, Copper in Colorado, Snowshoe Mountain Resort in West Virginia, and Stratton Mountain Resort in Vermont.

The new owners plan to reinstall the popular Wildwood Express ski lift that was repossessed by Bank of America in 2012. President Jon Reveal said the Wildwood Express ski lift is a priority for them as they work on finishing the partially completed resort. They also have plans to finish the Village Plaza, which has remained partially completed and empty for 12 years. They are targeting completing the majority of work for the 2019–2020 ski season.

Their purchase did not include the golf course, which does not currently have known development plans.

In October 2021, MMG Equity Partners took full ownership of Tamarack Resort from Imperium Companies and Blue River Family Offices. This announcement removes Imperium and Blue River from ownership, leaving a sole owner. The owners also expect to acquire the remaining portions of the Osprey Meadows golf course.

== 2019–2020 season ==
The Wildwood Express ski lift was reinstalled as planned for the 2019–2020 season. It is a high speed quad-chair with 18 towers, and is a 6 minute ride for 1646 feet of vertical rise. It added more than 200 acres of additional skiable terrain.

== See also ==
Tamarack Ski Area – defunct ski hill in Latah County on East Moscow Mountain
