= Tierra del Sol Resort, Spa & Country Club =

Resort complex in Aruba

Coordinates: 12°36′17″N 70°02′23″W

The Tierra del Sol Resort & Golf is a resort complex on the Caribbean island of Aruba. The resort comprises villas, a spa and fitness center, and an 18-hole golf course.

== Golf ==
The golf course opened on January 28, 1995. It was designed by Robert Trent Jones Jr., and plays between 6811 and 5002 yards. It is the only 18 hole golf course on Aruba. It contains the Tierra del Sol Salina Important Bird Area.

=== Tournaments held ===
- 1996, 1997 Aces Championship (Senior PGA Tour special event)
- 1996 Raymond Floyd Golf Tournament
- 1998 Shell's Wonderful World of Golf (Nick Price vs. Payne Stewart)
- 1996–2000 Johnnie Walker Pro-Am
- 2001–2006, 2013–2016 Aruba Invitational Pro-Am
- 2000–2006, 2016 KLM Aruba Open
- 2006 Tour de las Americas Nations Cup qualifiers
- 2016–2017 Aruba Cup (PGA Tour Latinoamérica vs. PGA Tour Canada)

=== Awards ===
- Golf Digest magazine 4½ Star Award (2000, 2001, 2002)
- Links magazine Top 100 Award (1997)
- Travel + Leisure Golf magazine Top Ten Golf Courses in the Caribbean (2001)
- World Travel Awards – Aruba's leading golf resort (2006)
