= Malmok =

Settlement in Aruba

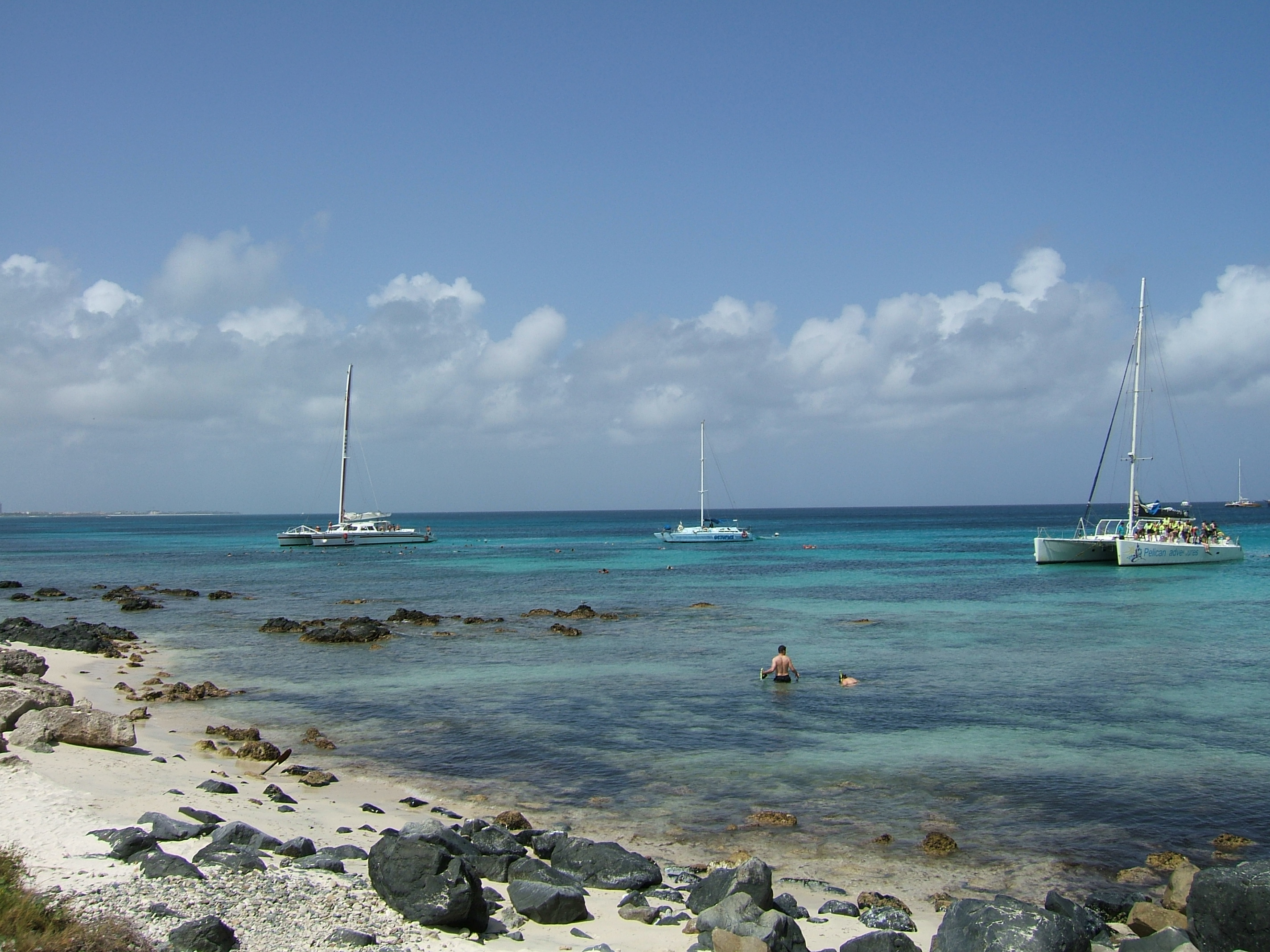
- Interactive map of Malmok
- Coordinates: 12°36′0″N 70°3′0″W

Area
  - Land: 8.726 km^{2} (3.369 sq mi)

Population (2020)
  - Total: ▲5,637
  - Density: 646/km^{2} (1,670/sq mi)

Malmok is a settlement in the Noord region of Aruba. As of 2010, it has a population of 5,105 people across 1,726 households. Human habitation in the region dates back to 450 BC.

== History ==
Radiocarbon dating has placed habitation of Malmok between 450 BC to 240 AD. Malmok was the site of a cemetery with 40 skeletons from an aceramic group dating to around 300 AD. Around 10% of the skeletons were placed on top of sea turtle carapaces.

The 4,400-ton German freighter Antilla was in the Caribbean when it received orders in August 1939 to return to Germany due to the coming outbreak of World War II. However, the Antilla was unable to reach the Atlantic and sought refuge in a natural Dutch port in Aruba. The ship remained in Aruba until it attempted to break the Allied blockade on 29 February 1940, but Dutch submarines prevented it from leaving. Martial law was enacted in response to the German invasion of the Netherlands and Dutch marines attempted to board the Antilla on 10 May. The crew opened the seacocks and caused it to sink off the coast of Malmok a few hours later. The 35 crew members were arrested and imprisoned until the end of the war. An open-air memorial was completed in 2024.

In the 1960s 4.2 million guilders were spent developing Malmok, including home construction and a pumping station.

Malmok is within the Noord region of Aruba.

== Environment ==
There are wetlands in the area around Malmok. Cliff ledges near Malmok are used as roosting sites by the brown booby.

== Economy ==
Of the economically active people in Malmok in 2010, 2,480 people were employed and 260 were unemployed. There were 423 students, 384 pensioners, and 182 spouses that remained at home.

== Demographics ==
Malmok had a population of 5,105 in 2010, with 2,460 being male and 2,644 being female, across 1,726 households. The native-born population was 3,238 and the foreign-born population was 1,860. Papiamento was the most spoken household language for 3,280 people, Spanish for 699 people, Dutch for 476 people, English for 356 people, and Chinese for 39 people.

== Works cited ==
=== Books ===
- Wells, Jeffrey; Wells, Allison (2017). Birds of Aruba, Bonaire, and Curacao: A Site and Field Guide. Cornell University Press. ISBN 9781501701078.

=== Journals ===
- Fitzpatrick, Scott (2006). "A Critical Approach to 14⁢C Dating in the Caribbean: Using Chronometric Hygiene to Evaluate Chronological Control and Prehistoric Settlement". Latin American Antiquity. 17 (4). Cambridge University Press: 389–418. doi:10.2307/25063065. JSTOR 25063065.
- Hoefte, Rosemarijn (1991). "Caribbean Studies 1990". European Review of Latin American and Caribbean Studies (51). Centrum voor Studie en Documentatie van Latijns Amerika: 101–118. doi:10.2307/25675518. JSTOR 25675518.
- Majewski, Rosemarijn (1991). "Current Research". American Antiquity. 56 (1). Cambridge University Press: 143–160. doi:10.2307/280980. JSTOR 280980.

=== News ===
- "Aan Aruba's westkust". Amigoe. 13 October 1966. p. 5.
- Lederman, Noah (14 April 2026). "Fifth Population and Housing Census". Smithsonian. Archived from the original on 9 May 2026.

=== Web ===
- "Fifth Population and Housing Census" (PDF). Statistics Netherlands. 1 September 2011. Archived (PDF) from the original on 9 May 2026.
