= Sta. Elena Golf Club =

Golf course in Santa Rosa, Laguna, Philippines

- Interactive map of Sta. Elena Golf Club
- 14°14′23.3″N 121°05′31.4″E

Club information
- Location: Sta. Elena Golf & Country Estate, Santa Rosa, Laguna, Philippines
- Established: 1992
- Type: Private
- Owner: Sta. Elena Golf Club, Inc.
- Tota holes: 27
- Tournaments: 1996 Espirito Santo Trophy
- Greens: TiffEagle dwarf Bermuda
- Website: www.staelenagolf.com

Banahaw Course
- Designed by: Robert Trent Jones Jr.

Makiling Course
- Designed by: Robert Trent Jones Jr.

Sierra Madre Course
- Designed by: Robert Trent Jones Jr.

The Sta. Elena Golf Club is a golf course within the Sta. Elena Golf & Country Estate in Santa Rosa, Laguna, Philippines.

== History ==
Businessman Rico Tantoco purchased 200 hectares (490 acres) of land in Laguna from the Yulo-Quiros family which was developed into a real estate project dubbed as the Sta. Elena Golf & Country Estate. As part of the deal, a portion of the sugar plantation was allotted for a golf course.

Construction of the Sta. Elena Golf Club began in 1992. The first nine holes were previewed in October 1992. The golf course became fully operational by 1995.

Sta. Elena Golf Club hosted the World Amateur Golf Team Championship for the Espirito Santo Trophy in November 1996.

The venue will host a tournament of the International Series in October 2025.

== Facilities ==
The Sta. Elena Golf Club has 27 holes covers an area of 87.9156 hectares (217.244 acres). It was designed by Robert Trent Jones Jr. under the Robert Trent Jones II Company. The establishment has three nine-hole nine-hole golf courses namely the Banahaw Course, Makiling Course, and the Sierra Madre Course.

== Tournaments ==
The Sta. Elena Golf Club has hosted the following international golf tournaments:

Year	Tournament	Winner
1996	Espirito Santo Trophy	South Korea: Han Hee-won; Kang Soo-yun; Kim Kyung-sook
2025	International Series Philippines	(France) Julien Sale
