= Arashi Beach =

Beach in Aruba

- Beach
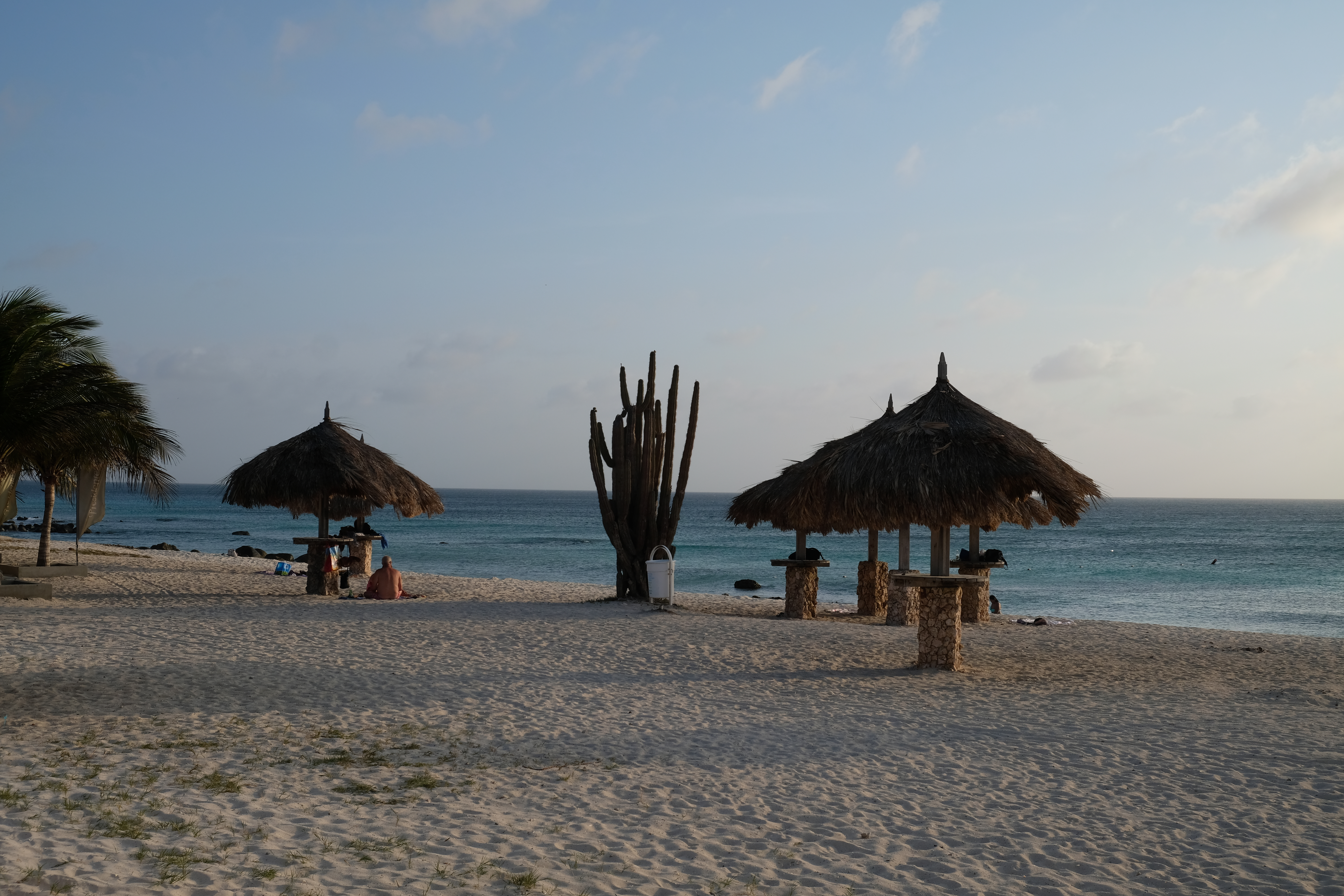

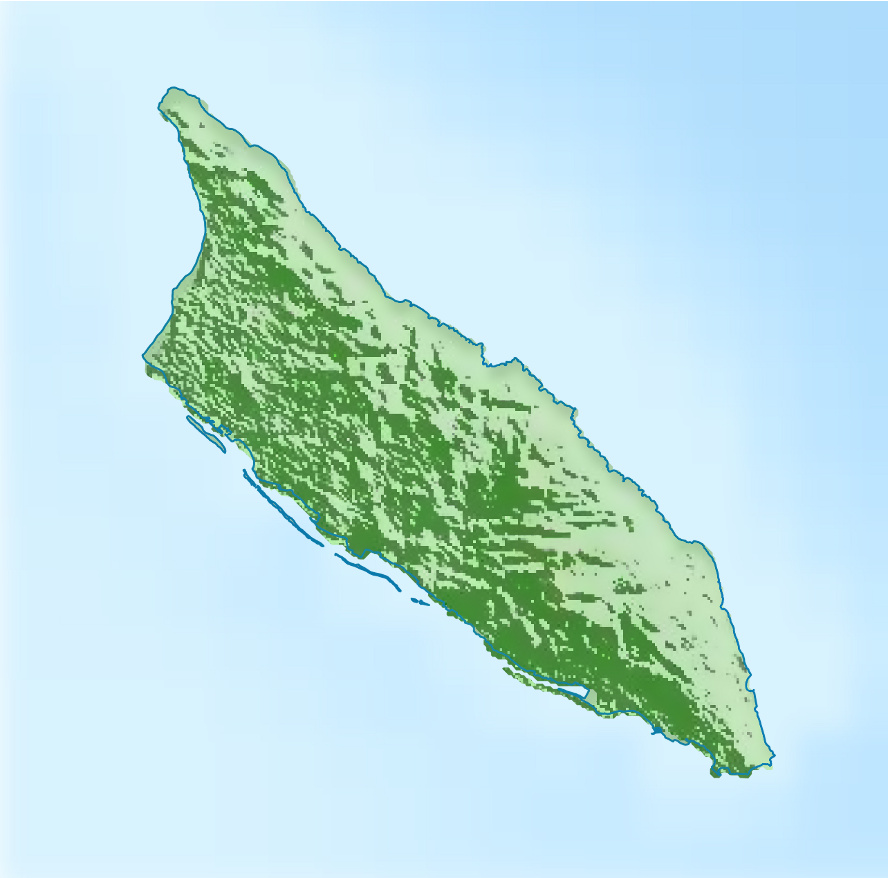
- Location within Aruba
- Coordinates: 12°36′34″N 70°3′11″W
- Location: Noord, Aruba, Netherlands

Arashi Beach (also spelled Arasji) is a white-sand beach on the northwestern tip of Aruba, in the Noord region. It is located near the settlement of Malmok and the California Lighthouse. The beach's calm waters are popular among sightseers, swimmers, and snorkelers.

== Etymology ==
Arashi is a toponym of indigenous origin. One possible etymology is that Arashi is derived from the singular form warashi, meaning "bonefish" in Papiamento. Arashi is one of the best locations in Aruba to catch bonefish, which was an important part of the indigenous Caquetio diet.

Another possibility is that Arashi is a bastardized form of arasi or araci, in which case the components ara and ci would mean "people" and "head", respectively. In this case, the name Arashi would then have the meaning of "head of the people" or "people's head".

== Location ==
Arashi Beach is located on the northwestern tip of Aruba. Administratively, it is part of the Noord region. The settlement of Malmok and the historic California Lighthouse are within walking distance of the beach.

== Tourism ==
Arashi Beach is a popular destination for tourists because of its calm waters and scenic beach. The beach is a favoured spot to watch the sunset or pelicans diving for fish; the former activity has earned Aruba's northern coast the nickname "the Gold Coast". There is also shelter from the sun in the form of free-to-use thatched beach huts called palapas. The reef off the southern coast of Arashi Beach is frequented by snorkelers, while fishing is commonplace in the rocky areas nearby.

== Preservation ==
Arashi Beach is a part of the Aruba Reef Care Project, an annual eco-awareness campaign to clean up reefs, shallow waters, and public beaches. The Foundation for Environmental Education has given Arashi Beach a "blue flag" certification, meaning the beach has met particular quality, safety, and public educational standards.

== Transportation ==
Arashi Beach is accessible by car and public transport. Arubus Route L10 provides a direct route to the beach, which has a parking lot next to it.
