= St Ann's Church, Aruba =

St Ann's Church
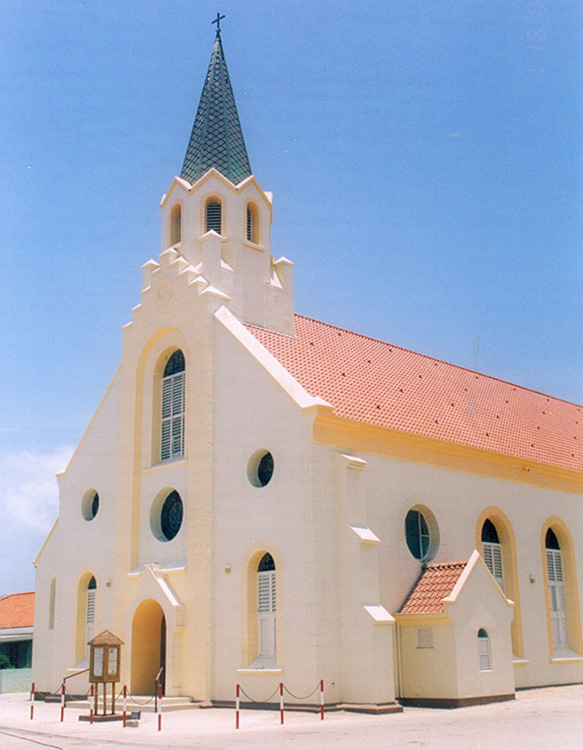
- St Ann's Church
- 12.5625°N 70.0313°W
- Location: Noord
- Country: Aruba
- Denomination: Roman Catholic

History
- Former name: Chapel of Alto Vista

Architecture
- Groundbreaking: 1914
- Completed: 1919

St Ann's Church is a Roman Catholic Church located along the northern portion of Aruba island within the Catholic Diocese of Willemstad. Although rebuilt several times, the church traces its history back to 1776. It temporarily closed for repairs due to damage in 2011 and has since reopened.

== Description ==
The original church on this site was begun in 1776 after the Chapel of Alto Vista fell into disuse and dedicated to Saint Ann, the mother of the Virgin Mary. When it was constructed in 1776, Santa Ana Church represented the island's second most important religious meeting place (the first being Alto Vista Chapel).

The church was rebuilt two times, once in 1831 and again in 1886. The Church was constructed between 1914 and 1919.

The carved oak retable in the Saint Ann is a fine example of neo-Gothic sculpture. It was created in 1870 by Hendrik van der Geld. They originated in the Netherlands, in the province of North-Brabant, but were later placed in the Antonius church in Scheveningen. When the Antonius Church was renovated in 1928, the parish priest donated the altar, the communion rail and pulpit to the Netherlands Antilles mission which sent it to Saint Ann.

It is noted that the retable, the communion rail and pulpit won a prize at the first Vatican Council held in Rome in 1870. A final renovation to this historical site was accomplished in 1916 (somewhere between 1919 and 1919).

The most recent renovation took place in 2002.

== Damage ==
On 25 August 2011, a severe downdraft caused damage to Saint Ann's roof and other areas. The altar, the communion rail and pulpit and remained unharmed although the roof was ripped open by the strong winds.

St. Ann's continued to offer mass under a tent in their parking lot until the roof was replaced.
