= Travel + Leisure Golf =

American magazine

Travel + Leisure Golf was a bimonthly American magazine published by American Express. Unlike other golf magazines, Travel + Leisure Golf focused less on the sport than on the affluent golf lifestyle, with regular features on cars, resorts, wines, and spirits.

== History and profile ==
The magazine was launched in March 1998 as a spin-off of Travel + Leisure, and was closed after the March–April 2009 issue. The final editor-in-chief was John Atwood. John Rodenburg joined as publisher in 2005. Columnists included Nick Faldo, Greg Norman and Mike Lupica.

Ian Shepherd ranked Travel + Leisure Golf as the "2nd Most Influential Golf Publication" in his 2006 and 2007 rankings.

== See also ==
- Golf Digest
- Golf Magazine
- Golf Week
- Golf World
- Kingdom
- Links Magazine
- golfscape
