= Wisley Golf Club =

Golf club in Surrey, England

The Wisley Golf Club
- Interactive map of The Wisley Golf Club
- 51.3192°N 0.482°W

Club information
- Location: Wisley, Surrey, England
- Established: 1991
- Type: Private
- Tota holes: 27
- Website: Official website

The Wisley Golf Club is a golf club in Wisley, Surrey, England. The club is only open to members and their guests.

The club has 700 members, each of whom own a single share in the club. The club is owned entirely by its members. Proposed members must pass a 'playing interview' with the club's Chief Executive, Director of Membership or Director of Golf.

The club has three nine-hole loops, named The Church, The Mill and The Garden. The course was designed by Robert Trent Jones Jr and opened in 1991.

Golf Monthly magazine listed the club as one of the '10 Most Exclusive Golf Clubs In the UK'. The golfer Francesco Molinari practised at Wisley before his move to the United States.

This club is in a popular golfing area in England. St. George’s Hill, Woking, Walton Heath, West Hill, Sunningdale and Wentworth are all within a 30-minute drive, and professionals from the DP World Tour often visit this area.
