= Golfscape =

golfscape
- Company type: Private
- Website type: Online golf reservations
- Available in: English; Japanese; Simplified Chinese
- Founded: 2013
- Headquarters: London, {{{location_country}}}
- Area served: Worldwide
- Founders: Raghad Mukhaimer; Michael Galasso
- CEO: Raghad Mukhaimer
- Industry: Travel, Golf
- Services: Reservation Services
- Website: golfscape.com
- Current status: Online

Golfscape (styled as golfscape) is an online golf reservation service founded in London by Raghad Mukhaimer and Michael Galasso. The company provides services to find, plan, and book golf in 50 countries.

== History ==
The company was created by entrepreneur and golfer Raghad Mukhaimer to cater to golf courses that had a poor Internet presence.

According to Mukhaimer and co-founder Michael Galasso, online booking for golf is non-existent in most countries, despite the process being commonplace for flights, hotels and rentals. The two designed the site to make the task of building a golf course page quick and easy for course managers. The beta version of the service was released in 2013. The site fully launched on August 19, 2014.

On June 25, 2015, Golfscape entered into a partnership with global sports management company IMG for their courses.

golfscape released their official World's Top 100 Golf Course ranking 2020, announcing Royal Dornoch Golf Club as the number 1 golf course in the world.

== Services ==
The golf concierge service operates online through desktops, tablets, or mobile devices. The platform provides course profiles for golf course operators.

Users can book golf reservations mostly in the United States, but also some international courses in places such as Da Nang, Vietnam; Cape Town, South Africa; and Hua Hin, Thailand. The platform gives the ability to rate and review courses.
