= Noord =

Town and region in Aruba

- Region
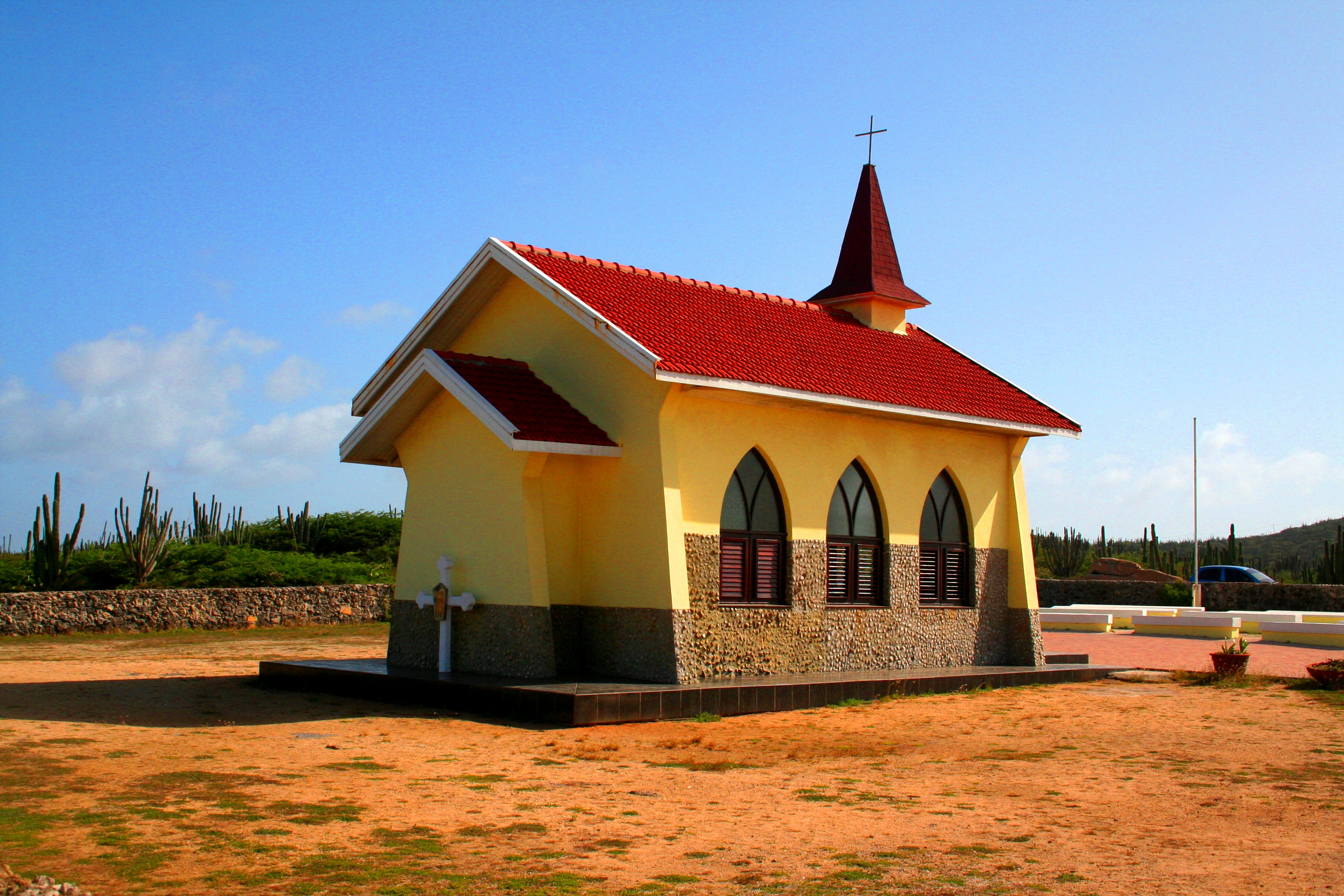
- Alto Vista Chapel in 2011
- Interactive map of Noord
- Coordinates: 12°34′N 70°02′W
- Country: Aruba
- Region: Noord

Area
  - Total: 35.73 km^{2} (13.80 sq mi)

Population (2020)
  - Total: 24,193
  - Density: 677.1/km^{2} (1,754/sq mi)
- Time zone: UTC-4 (AST)

Noord (Dutch pronunciation: [noːrt]) is a town and region in Aruba (part of the Kingdom of the Netherlands). This town is known for its low rise and high rise hotels, restaurants, beaches, malls, the California Lighthouse, and other places of attraction.

Places of interest in Noord include Alto Vista Chapel, Bubali Bird Sanctuary, California Lighthouse, Palm Beach and Arashi Beach.

== Tanki Flip ==
The town of Tanki Flip is home to an Amerindian settlement whose remains date from 1000 to 1500. The village contained several malocas (long houses) with several smaller round houses and a central hut surrounded by an open plaza. The village was fenced off and inhabited by Caquetio people.

== Cas Tan Tin ==
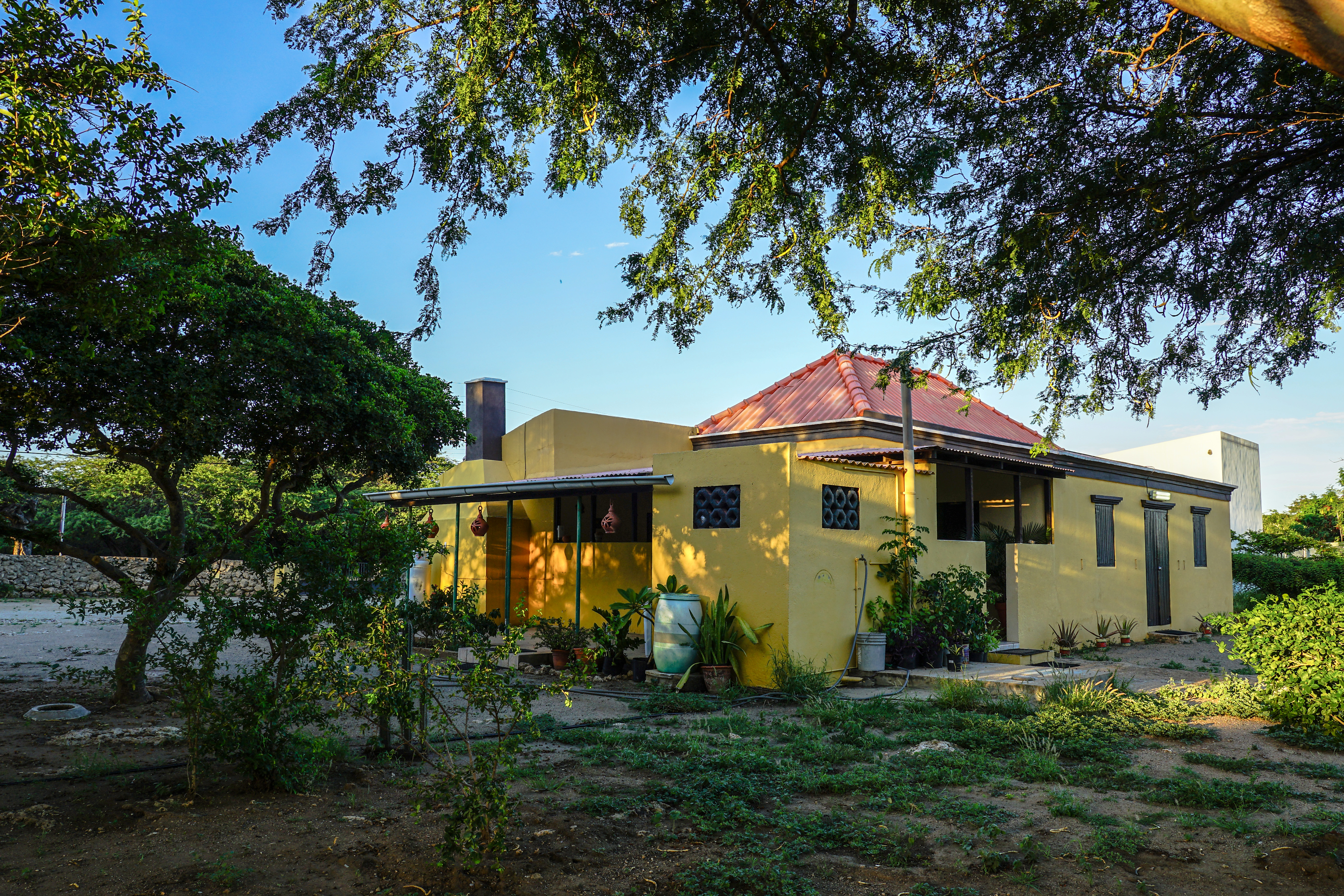
Cunucu house Cas Tan Tin

Cas Tan Tin is a cunucu (rural) house in Noord. It was built by Mario and Johanna Tromp in the early 20th century. They raised nine children and grew fruits and vegetables at Cas Tan Tin. Nowadays it is located in the suburban sprawl. In 2019, it was bought by the Monuments Fund Aruba, because it is a traditional house in perfect condition with authentic furniture. On 29 September 2019, Cas Tan Tin opened for public viewing.

== Commanders' Graves ==
Up to 1754, only the commanders and employees of the Dutch West India Company (WIC) were allowed on the island of Aruba. One of the cemeteries of the WIC employees is located on the dirt road between Sero Patrishi and Shiribana. There are 16 graves at the cemetery, however the only readable epitaph is of Simon Plats who died in on 14 August 1827. In 1989, the graves were transferred to the monuments funds and restored.

== Notable people ==
- Jean-Marc Antersijn (1996), football player.
- Olga Orman (1943–2021), author, poet and storyteller.
- Sidney Ponson (1976), a Major League Baseball Professional pitcher.
- Chadwick Tromp (1995), a Major League Baseball Professional catcher.
