= Geography of Aruba =

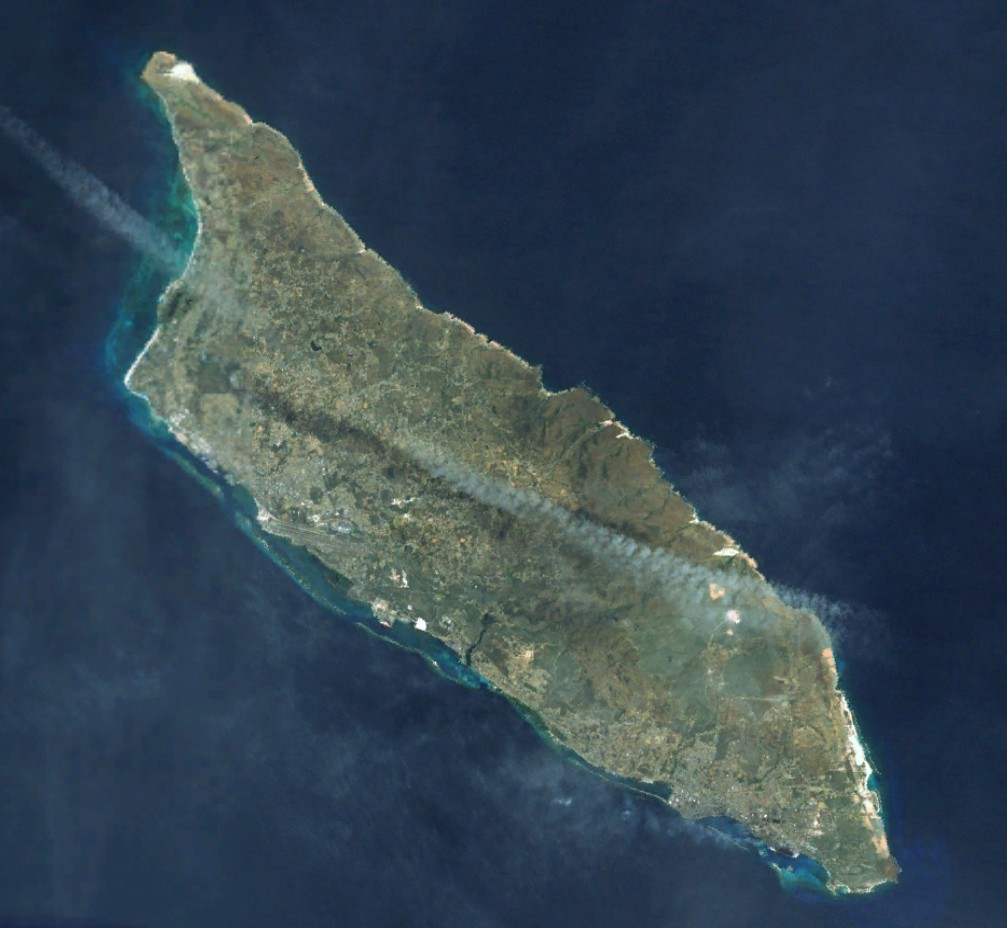
- Region: Caribbean
- Coordinates: 12°30′N 69°58′W
- Area
  - Total: 193 km^{2} (75 sq mi)
- Coastline: 68.5 km (42.6 mi)
- Highest point: Jamanota; 188 metres (617 ft)
- Climate: Tropical semi-arid

The geography of Aruba, located at the juncture of the South American and Caribbean tectonic plates, has been shaped by a complex interplay of geological processes. From its flat expanses to its rugged coastlines, Aruba's geography and geology reveal the island's geographical diversity and its underlying geological formations, offering a comprehensive understanding of Aruba's terrain and environmental dynamics of this Caribbean destination.

== Geography ==
Aruba (the westernmost island among the ABC Islands and of the Leeward Antilles) is situated in a unique geological location, right at the boundary between the South American and Caribbean tectonic plates. It is located 25 kilometres (16 mi) north of the Venezuela coast and 68 kilometres (42 mi) northwest of Curaçao. Aruba covers a total area of 193 square kilometres (75 sq mi) and a coast line of 68.5 kilometres (42.6 mi). This region is characterized by a complex fault system where the Caribbean Plate moves westward in relation to South America. Aruba is the westernmost island in the Aruba-La Blanquilla Chain, a series of small islands and atolls located along the Venezuelan continental border.

Aruba, as well as the rest of the ABC islands and also Trinidad and Tobago, lies on the continental shelf of South America, and is thus geologically considered to lie entirely in South America.

=== Landscape ===
The geography of Aruba is characterized by a relatively flat to gently rolling terrain with some low hills. The highest point on the island is Jamanota, reaching almost 188 metres (617 ft) in elevation. There are three distinct types of landscapes on the island.

In the western part, features a gently sloping plain with shallow dry valleys. This area is flanked by a zone of horizontal bedded to slightly seaward-dipping limestone rocks on its western side. Moving towards the central part of the island, the terrain becomes more rugged. This region developed in the outcrop area of the metamorphosed volcanic rocks of the Aruba Lava Formation (ALF), and it features east-to-west running valleys controlled by faults. The ALF cover an area of approximately 23.7 square kilometres (9.2 sq mi). The southeastern part of Aruba is predominantly defined by Neogene and younger limestone formations. Along the eastern coast, near Boca Grandi and Seroe Colorado, well-developed Quaternary terraces can be observed. Forereef deposits line the south and southwestern coast between Ceru Colorado and the urban center of Oranjestad.

The arid landscape in Aruba is not solely a product of its climate but is also a consequence of extensive deforestation and exploitation during the Spanish colonization of the island. Consequently, certain crops, such as aloe vera, thrive in this environment, due to the high calcium-rich soil known as liming. As of 2022, Aruba only has 2.3% of forest-covered land area and only 0.5% of protected natural area. In Aruba forest cover is around 2% of the total land area, equivalent to 420 hectares (ha) of forest in 2020, which was unchanged from 1990. In 2020, naturally regenerating forest covered 420 hectares (ha) and planted forest covered 0 hectares (ha). Of the naturally regenerating forest 0% was reported to be primary forest (consisting of native tree species with no clearly visible indications of human activity) and around 0% of the forest area was found within protected areas.

==== Elevations ====
Aruba is predominantly characterized by its flat terrain. However, there are notable exceptions that add diversity to its landscape. Two well-known rock formations, the Ayo and Casibari Rock Formations.

In contrast, the northern coast of Aruba features a more hilly topography, particularly within the Arikok National Park. The island's highest point, Jamanota, stands at a modest elevation of 188 m (617 ft) above sea level, while Arikok itself reaches 186 m (610 ft). Another prominent landmark, Hooiberg, rises to 165 m (541 ft). Despite not being the island's highest peak, Hooiberg appears as such due to its location in the flat surroundings. It is a recognizable feature that can be observed from nearly every point on the island.

==== Coastal form ====
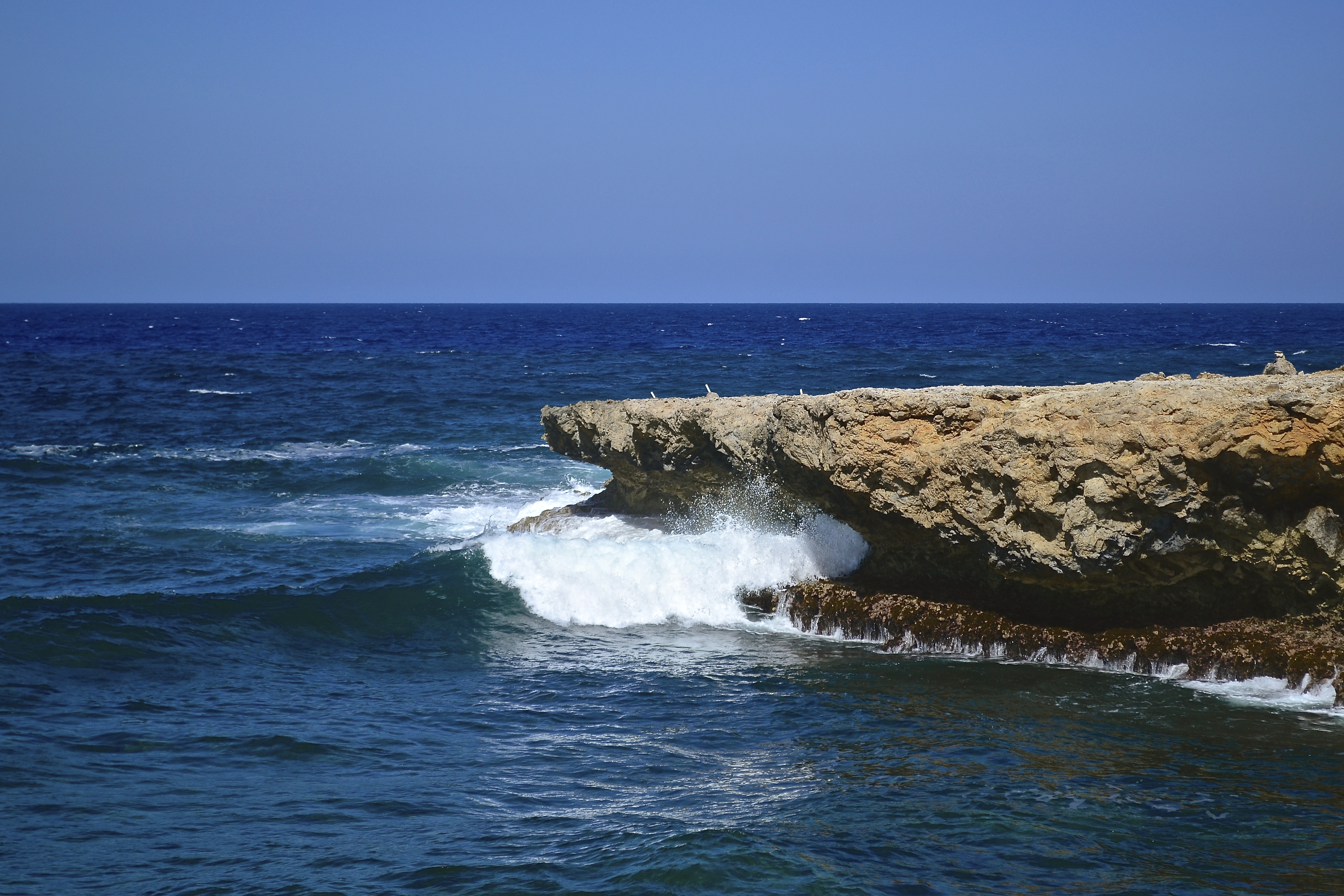
Limestone marine terrace at the north coast of Aruba (2014)

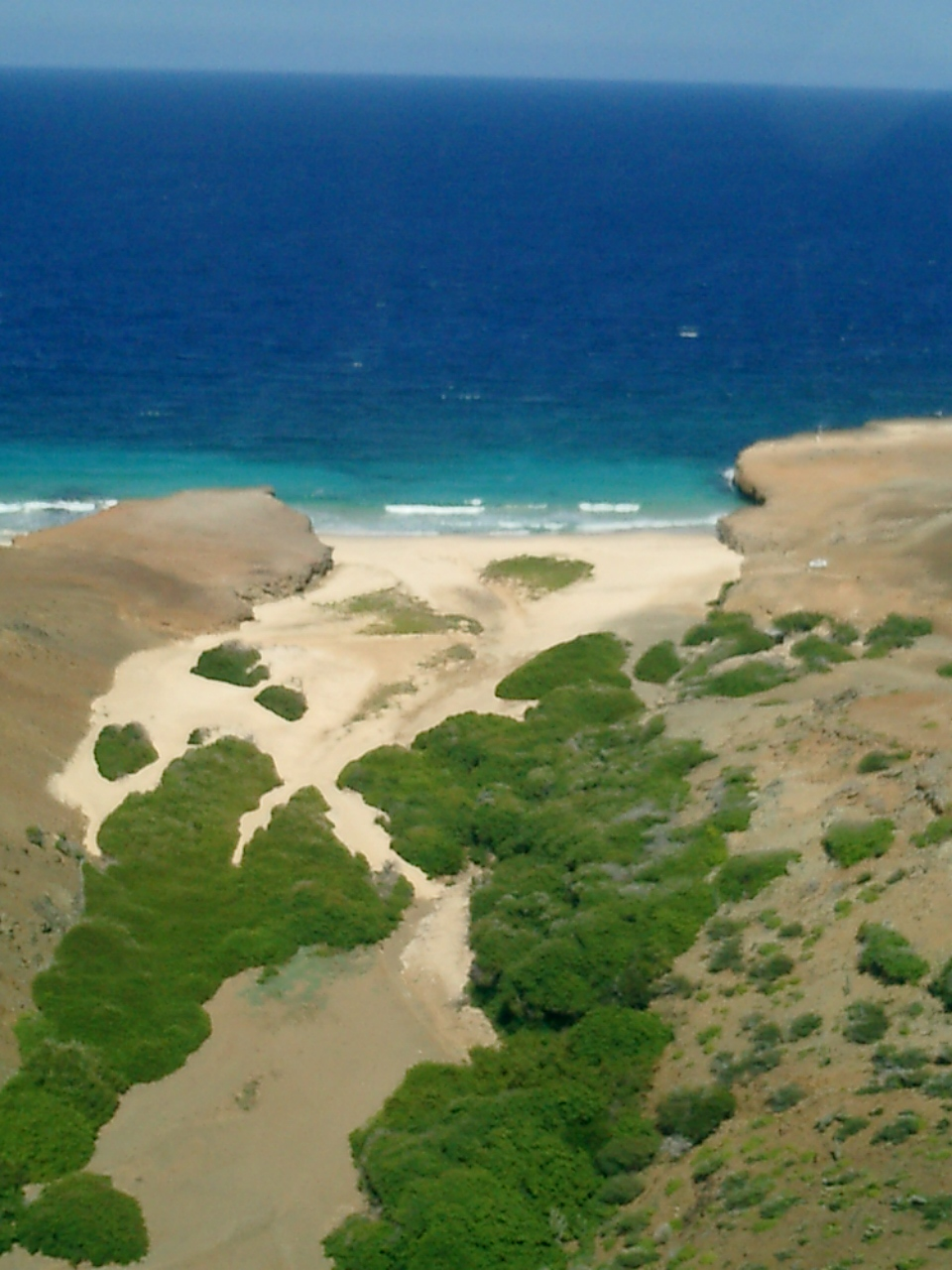
Boca Daimari in Arikok National Park (2004)

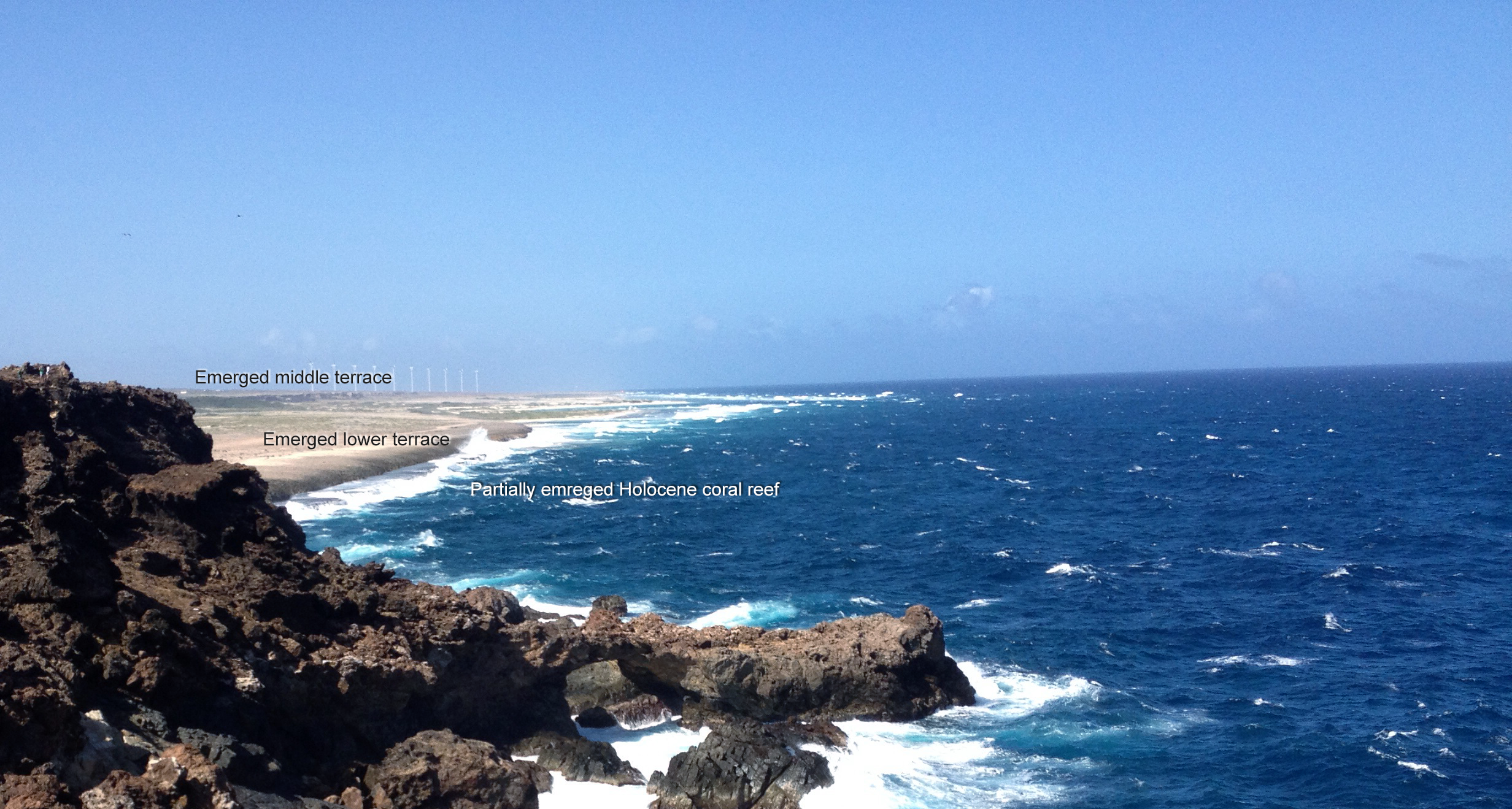
Emerged lower and middle terraces with partially submerged holocene coral reef

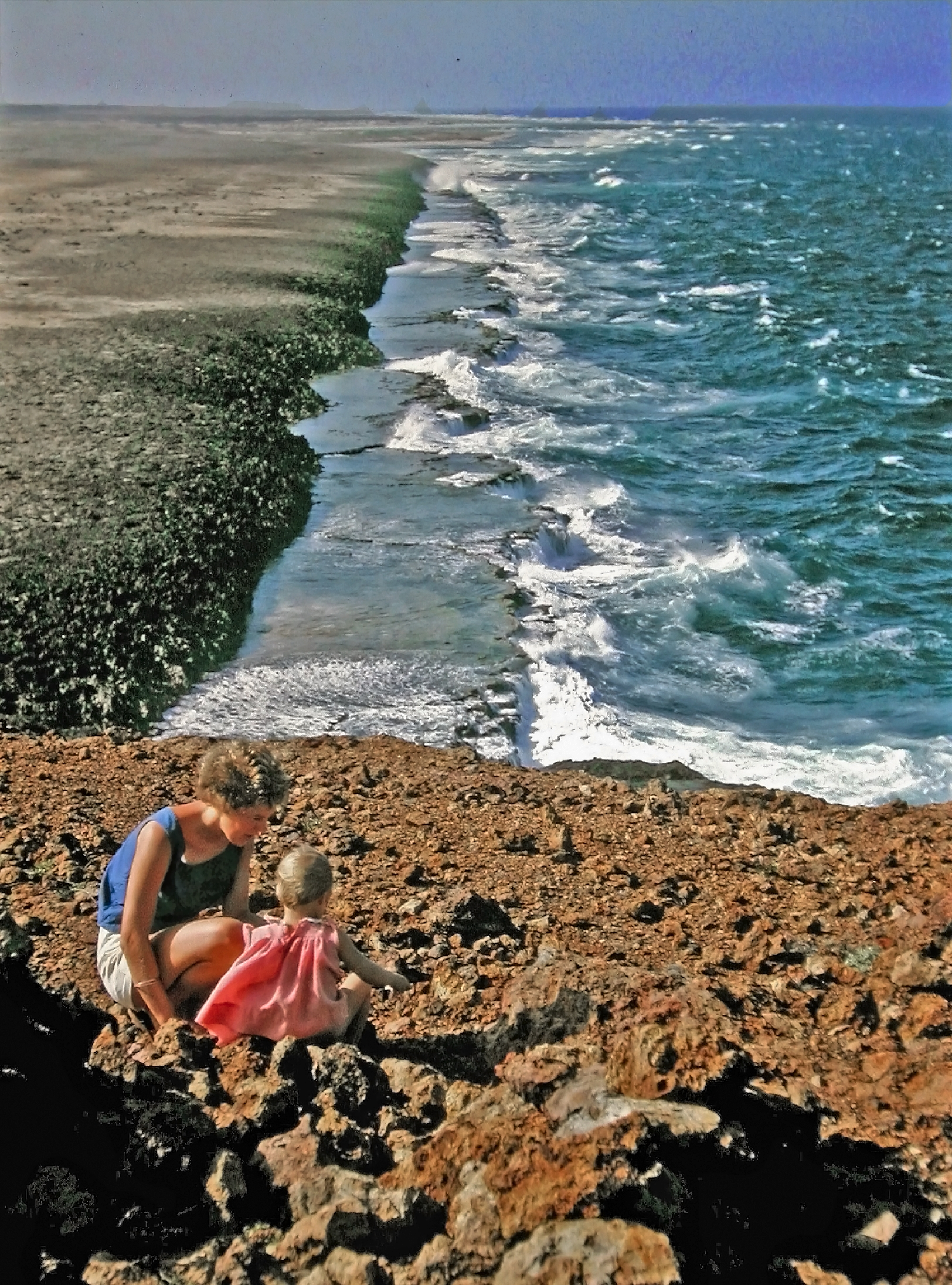
Partially submerged holocene coral reef.

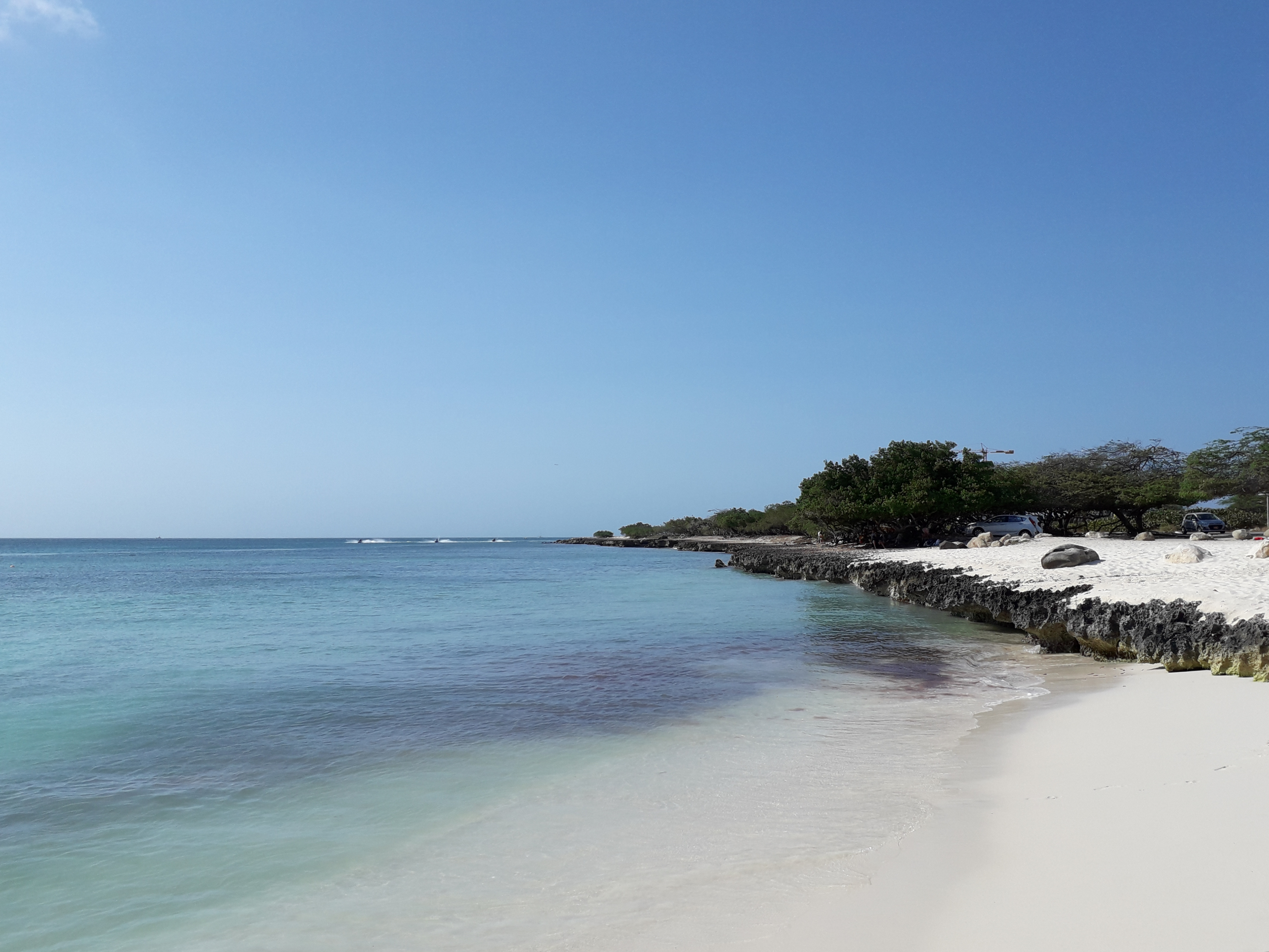
Limestone terrace on the southwestern coast, narrow platforms with less distinct backslopes

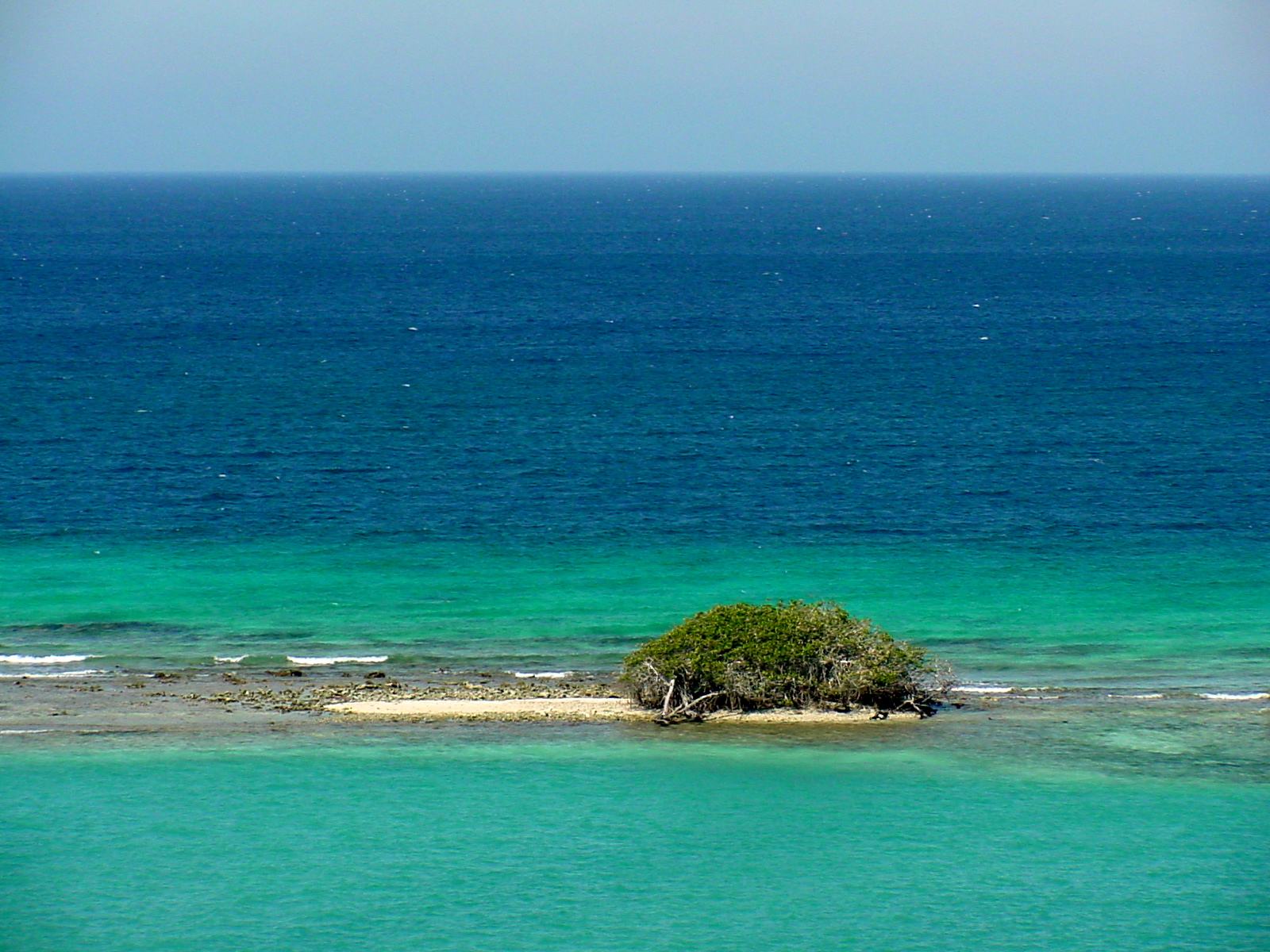
A section of the barrier reef of the coast of Oranjestad

In stark contrast to the southern shores, Aruba's northern sea is typically characterized by rough waters with a deep blue hue, rocky terrain and consists mostly of wave-cut coral limestone terraces interspersed with small sandy coves referred to as boca in Papiamento, which translates to "mouth" in English. The marine terraces of Aruba are most prominent on their windward, or northeast, coasts. In these areas, some of the terraces exhibit wide platforms and steep, angular backslopes. Conversely, on the leeward, or southwest, sides of the islands, the terraces tend to have narrower platforms and gentler backslopes. On occasion, particularly on the southwest side of Aruba, the backslopes are less distinct.

The distinctive appearance of the wave-cut terraces is influenced by the islands' location within the arid region along the southern Caribbean coastline. Limestone, known for its resistance to the effects of arid climate weathering, has contributed to the remarkable preservation of these terraces. Although a light layer of xerophytic vegetation lightly covers their surfaces, the terraces remain excellently preserved.

Aruba has a barrier reef, it generally lies about 400 yards (370 m) offshore and extends along the southwest coast between Punta Brabo and Oranjestad. It is composed of coral and is capped by a beach ridge of coral fragments 2 to 10 feet (0.61 to 3.05 m) in height. On the seaward side, the reef extends to a depth of at least 150 feet (46 m).

== Geological development ==
The oldest geological unit visible on Aruba is the ALF, which comprises volcanic and volcaniclastic rocks of basaltic composition, with a thickness exceeding 3,000 metres (9,800 ft). These rocks have undergone metamorphism due to the intrusion of the Aruba Batholith. The age of this formation is believed to be Turonian, supported by ammonite imprints found in conglomeratic mudstone.

The Aruba Batholith, which intruded the Aruba Lava Formation, primarily consists of hornblende tonalite. Pendants of quartz-norite to quartz-hornblende gabbro are present in the roof of the tonalite. Both the Aruba Lava Formation and the batholith are intersected by numerous dikes. The batholith's intrusion occurred around 85 to 90 million years ago, with subsequent reheating of the rocks between 73 and 67 Myr.

The limestone terraces are categorized based on their elevation, a feature commonly associated with slow uplifting active margins. The lower terrace, situated at an elevation of 5–10 metres (16–33 ft), has a range age of 30–129 thousand years (Kyr). In contrast, the middle terrace, located at 15–25 metres (49–82 ft), dates back up to 510 Kyr, indicating a slow (0.05 mm/yr) rate of tectonic uplift of Aruba.

Aruba was above sea level during the Oligocene epoch. However, Aruba later subsided beneath the sea level in the middle Miocene, as documented by the emergence of widespread elevated coastal limestone terraces. This geological history has left a distinct mark on Aruba's landscape and formation.

== Biogeography ==
=== Non-native species ===
==== Goats ====
Introduced in the early 16th century, feral goats (Capra hircus) and donkeys pose a significant threat to Aruba's environments, causing both direct and indirect harm due to excessive grazing. This often leads to ecosystem deterioration and a decline in biodiversity. Despite their impact, these animals remain a local food source, with goat stew and soup being popular dishes in the region. Arikok, spanning 20% of the country, is home to a substantial goat population. Recent research estimates the goat population at approximately 1,465 individuals by counting fresh pellets.

Non-native lionfish distribution (1985 - 2020)

==== Lionfish ====
The lionfish, originally from the Indo-Pacific, were introduced to the Atlantic Ocean in the mid-1980s. Their population has since grown significantly because they lack natural predators in their new environment. This unchecked growth has led to a decline in fish and crustacean populations, and even the health of coral reefs is suffering as herbivorous fish vanish. NOAA researchers confirm that invasive lionfish populations will keep increasing and can't be eradicated using conventional methods.

Aruba LionFish Initiative (ALFI), a group of divers that regularly hunt invasive species, have taken the initiative to reduce the lionfish population in coastal areas by hunting them for food and crafting jewelry from their fins.

==== Boa constrictor ====
In 1999, the initial boa constrictor was discovered in Aruba. Despite attempts to control their growth, a population covering the entire island had taken hold by 2005. Being an invasive species, their adaptable diet can potentially endanger many native populations. A 2021 study examined the stomach contents of more than 500 captured Aruban boas. The findings revealed over 400 distinct prey types, with an almost equal distribution among mammals, lizards, and birds. Remarkably, aside from the seven known bat species in Aruba, nearly every other type of vertebrate was found in the stomach contents analyzed.

==== Cane toad ====
The Cane toad, also called Sapo locally, is an invasive species with a detrimental impact on Aruba's fauna, such as the Dori (Pleurodema brachyops). However, the Aruban Cat-eyed Snake or Santanero (Leptodeira bakeri) preys on these toads and is considered a natural "pest control". Toads favor damp environments, including (irrigated) gardens of residential homes and tourist accommodations, such as hotels and resorts. However, toads are true survivors and can easily adapt to drier conditions, as found in the arid climate of the Caribbean islands.

==== Anoles and geckos ====
In 2019, three new non-native reptiles have been discovered on Aruba, including Anolis gingivinus, Anolis cristatellus, Hemidactylus frenatus. Anole and gecko species are often unintentionally introduced to Caribbean islands through the live plant trade, but can also be intentionally introduced as pets. Similar to many non-native lizards in the Caribbean, these species often inhabit human-altered environments (anthropogenic habitats), and their impacts on Aruba's native species is not yet fully understood. Aruba has a recorded history of 10 previous introduction of non-native reptiles species, including two anoles, Anolis sagrei and A. porcatus, and four geckos, Gonatodes albogularis, G. antilensis, G. vittatus, and Hemidactylus mabouia.

== Climatology ==
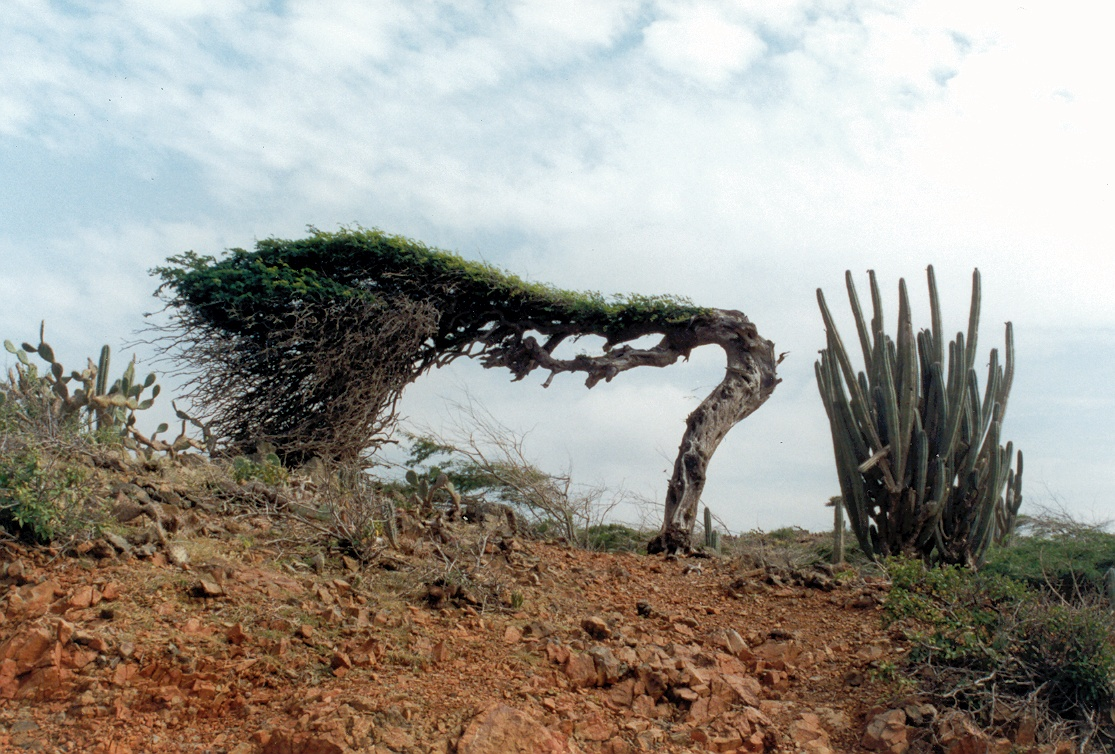
Watapana tree, also known as Dividivi (fruit pods), distorted by the northeast trade winds.

Located within the tropics, Aruba features a hot semi-arid climate (Köppen BSh) characterized by consistently warm temperatures throughout the year. There have been lasting environmental challenges linked to climate and nature. Sea water temperatures, for example, have gradually risen by at least 1.3 °C (2.3 °F) since the 1950s.

=== Southern Oscillation impact ===
The rainy season typically occurs between September and January. However, it exhibits significant variability due to the strong influence of the Southern Oscillation. During strong El Niño years like 1911/1912, 1930/1931, 1982/1983 and 1997/1998 annual (fiscal year) rainfall can plummet to as little as 150 millimetres or 6 inches. In contrast, during La Niña years like 1933/1934, 1970/1971, 1988/1989, 1999/2000 or 2010/2011, rainfall can soar to as much as 1,000 millimetres or 39 inches. The highest monthly totals during these La Niña events can reach between 350 and 400 millimetres (14 and 16 in).

Climate data for Oranjestad, Aruba (normals 1991-2020, extremes 1951-2020)
Month	Jan	Feb	Mar	Apr	May	Jun	Jul	Aug	Sep	Oct	Nov	Dec	Year
Record high °C (°F)	32.5 (90.5)	33.0 (91.4)	33.9 (93.0)	34.4 (93.9)	34.9 (94.8)	35.2 (95.4)	35.3 (95.5)	36.1 (97.0)	36.5 (97.7)	35.4 (95.7)	35.0 (95.0)	34.8 (94.6)	36.5 (97.7)
Mean daily maximum °C (°F)	30.3 (86.5)	30.6 (87.1)	31.1 (88.0)	31.9 (89.4)	32.0 (89.6)	32.5 (90.5)	32.4 (90.3)	33.2 (91.8)	33.2 (91.8)	32.4 (90.3)	31.5 (88.7)	30.7 (87.3)	31.8 (89.2)
Daily mean °C (°F)	27.0 (80.6)	27.1 (80.8)	27.4 (81.3)	28.2 (82.8)	28.7 (83.7)	29.0 (84.2)	28.9 (84.0)	29.5 (85.1)	29.6 (85.3)	29.1 (84.4)	28.4 (83.1)	27.5 (81.5)	28.4 (83.1)
Mean daily minimum °C (°F)	24.8 (76.6)	24.8 (76.6)	25.3 (77.5)	26.0 (78.8)	26.7 (80.1)	26.9 (80.4)	26.7 (80.1)	27.2 (81.0)	27.3 (81.1)	26.7 (80.1)	26.0 (78.8)	25.3 (77.5)	26.1 (79.0)
Record low °C (°F)	19.0 (66.2)	20.6 (69.1)	21.2 (70.2)	21.5 (70.7)	21.8 (71.2)	22.7 (72.9)	21.2 (70.2)	21.3 (70.3)	22.1 (71.8)	21.9 (71.4)	22.0 (71.6)	20.5 (68.9)	19.0 (66.2)
Average rainfall mm (inches)	44.0 (1.73)	19.5 (0.77)	10.0 (0.39)	8.6 (0.34)	14.1 (0.56)	17.4 (0.69)	19.6 (0.77)	31.4 (1.24)	42.9 (1.69)	76.5 (3.01)	87.1 (3.43)	80.1 (3.15)	451.1 (17.76)
Average rainy days (≥ 1.0 mm)	10.8	4.5	2.0	1.5	1.7	2.8	4.1	3.1	3.3	7.3	9.6	11.0	61.7
Average relative humidity (%)	77.8	76.2	75.9	76.9	77.9	77.4	77.8	75.6	76.2	77.9	78.8	77.9	77.2
Source: Departamento Meteorologico Aruba

== Conservation geography ==
The origins of over-tourism can be traced back to the 1970s and 1980s when people first expressed concerns about the possible negative effects on society and the environment due to uncontrolled tourism growth. These concerns also included the long-term economic consequences.

Environmental problems such as beach erosion, reef destruction, pollution, resource depletion, habitat loss, and the loss of natural beauty are significant forms of environmental damage. These issues can severely affect the small island tourism economy (SITES or SIDS). Aruba, recognized worldwide as the 'One Happy Island' and one of the most tourism-dependent small island economies, it offers valuable insights into the complex and ever-changing aspects of over-tourism, including the rise in economic inequality, environmental decline, social disparities, institutional issues.

An illustration of institutional challenges arises from the scrutiny faced by the Aruban Ministry responsible for environmental affairs. Their involvement in disseminating misleading information about the environmental repercussions of an upcoming hotel project near Baby Beach has come under question. Despite an official press release asserting that the project would have no adverse effects on the environment, both the Environment Minister, Otmar Oduber, and the head of the development group, Enrique Martinón Garcia, acknowledged potential negative impacts during the hotel's groundbreaking event. This incident underscores concerns about the transparency and accuracy of information related to environmental policies and its communication to the public.

=== Designated sites ===
The Arikok National Park Foundation (FPNA) oversees Key Biodiversity Areas (KBA). The KBA encompasses approximately 25% of Aruba's total surface area, these include Arikok National Park, Spaans Lagoen (Spanish Lagoon), marine park Aruba (MPA), and other designated terrestrial areas.

1. California Dunes
2. Saliña (salt flat) Tier del Sol
3. Saliña Malmok/ Saliña Serka
4. Saliña Palm Beach/ Plas The Mill Resort
5. Bubali Plas (pond)
6. Sero Teishi
7. Ramsar site: Spaans Lagoen and MPA Mangel Halto
8. Rooi Bringamosa
9. Rooi Taki
10. Rooi Manoonchi
11. MPA Oranjestad Reef Islands
12. Mangrove sites (Cay, Parkietenbos, Isla di Oro/Mangel Halto, Commandeursbaai)
13. Rooi Lamoenchi
14. Saliña Savaneta
15. MPA Seroe Colorado

=== Environmental policies ===
==== Chemical pollution: Oxybenzone in sunscreen ====
The chemical Oxybenzone in sunscreen products is banned due to its harmful effects on marine life and coral reefs when it enters the ocean. This ban is part of the "Choose Zero" concept law aimed at educating the community about the ban. Oxybenzone is commonly used in sunscreen, plastics, cosmetics, hair spray, and nail polish as a UV protector and stabilizer. While it helps protect the skin from UV rays, it also causes severe damage to corals and can lead to hormonal imbalances. The ban includes the import, sale, and distribution of single-use plastic products and Oxybenzone-containing products. Scientific studies have shown that Oxybenzone negatively impacts corals and marine biodiversity, and its presence in concentrated areas irreversibly affects coral conditions. The law's main objective is to prevent further damage to nature and the environment, promoting a healthier quality of life without single-use plastics and Oxybenzone-containing products.

Even though regional zoning and marine conservation plans were put in place in 2019, Aruba's natural habitats and marine environment have been without protection for over a century. This lack of protection dates back to the days of phosphate (Aruba Phosphate Company), gold (Aruba Gold Concessions), and oil refining industries (Lago Oil and Transport Company and Arend Petroleum Company) in the 1920s, and the subsequent growth of large-scale tourism and urbanization since the late 1970s.

==== Protection of flora and fauna and Sand ordinance ====
Aruba is committed to safeguarding its natural environment through international and local regulations. The international treaty CITES, as well as Aruba's National Ordinance for the Protection of Native Flora and Fauna and the Sand Ordinance, strictly prohibit the removal or export of seashells, corals, and beach sand from the island.

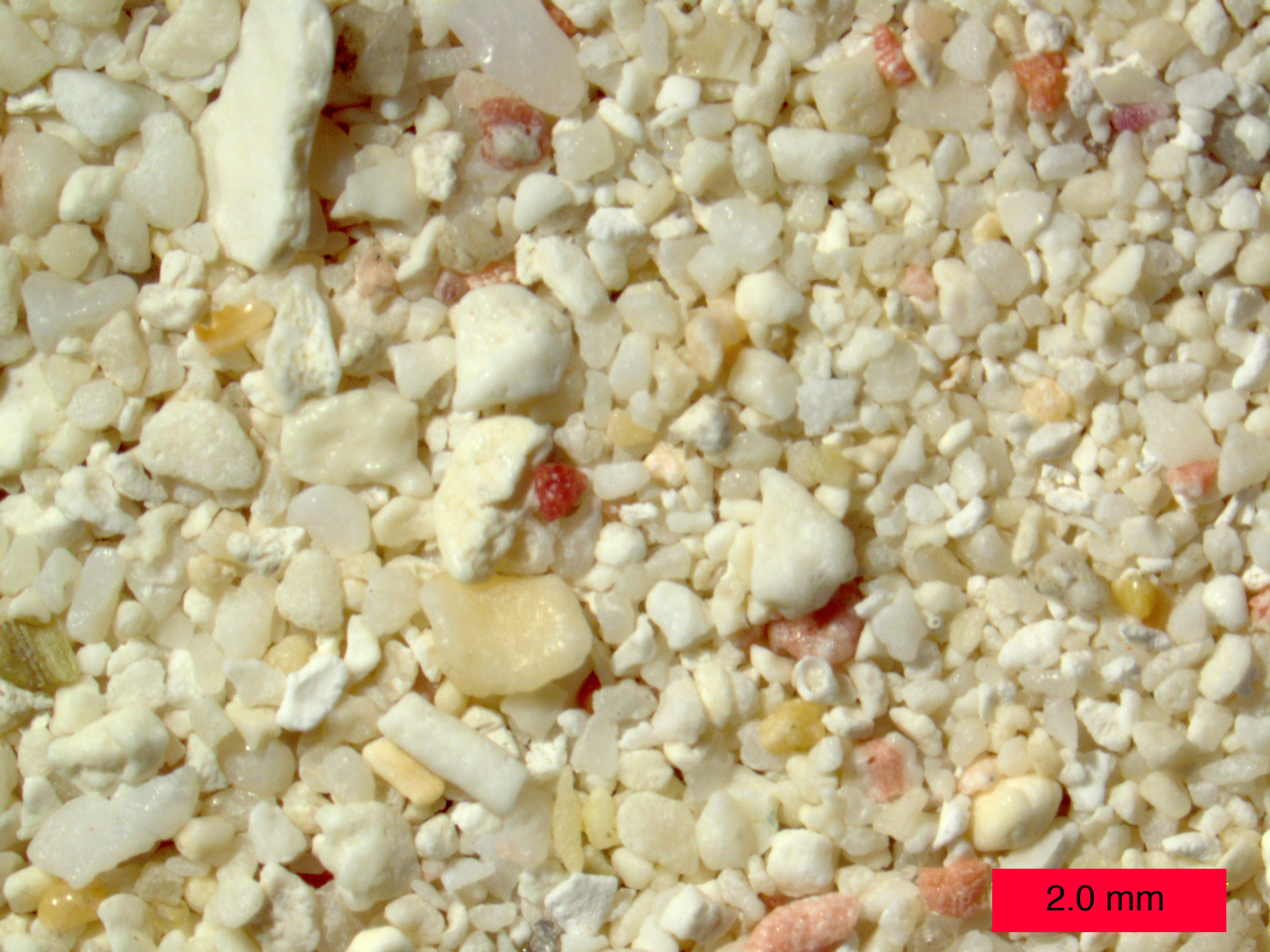
Coral sand from Aruba's beach

Recent increases in the confiscation of these items have raised concerns that local residents may be involved in illegal sales to tourists. Instead of collecting these items, it's advisable to take a picture as a souvenir, as the removal of seashells can have a significant impact on the environment.

Shells play a critical role in maintaining our ecosystem. They stabilize beaches, provide shelter for creatures like hermit crabs, offer hiding places for small fish, and serve as nesting material for shorebirds. As shells break down, they release essential nutrients for organisms in the sand and those forming their own shells. The ocean supports delicate ecosystems, and any disruption can have devastating consequences. Each shell has a unique ecological role.

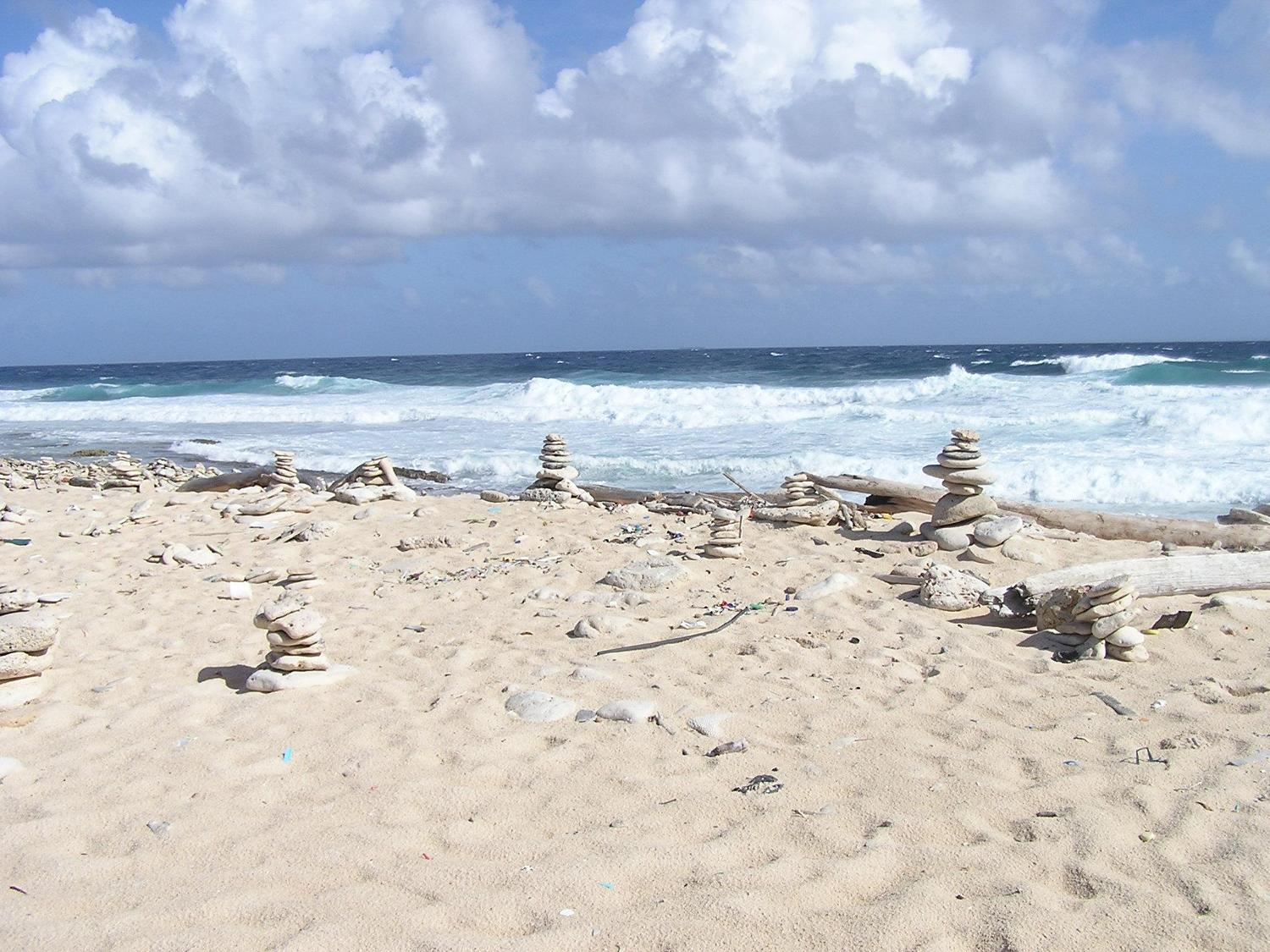
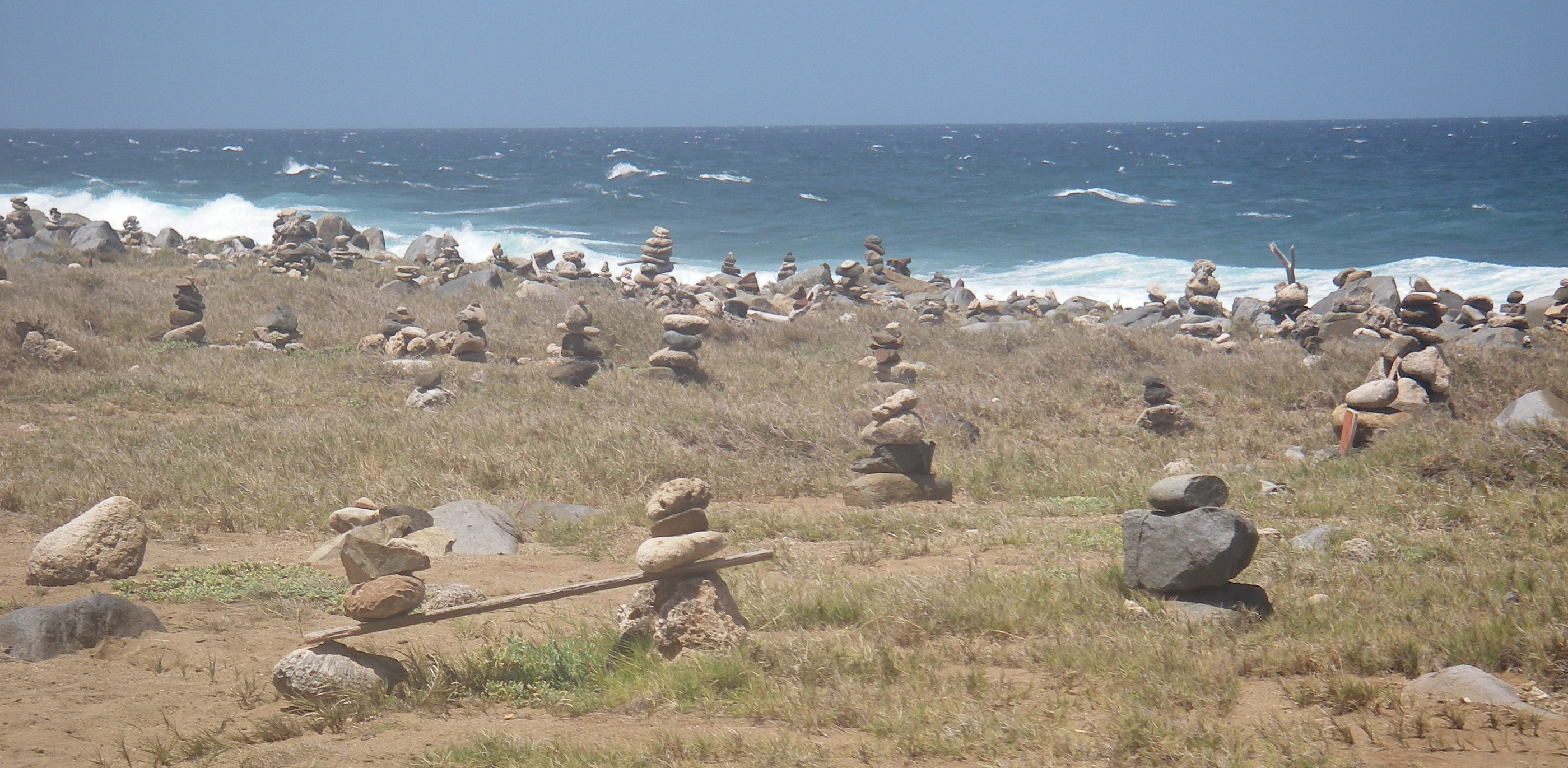
Human impact on the environment: rock stacks or balancing disrupting ecology. Small wildlife depend on rock gaps for shelter and safety.

=== Ecological stressors ===
==== Light pollution ====
Aruba's infrastructure, including the tourism sector, was developed without considering the potential impacts of light pollution on the ecological environment and human experiences.

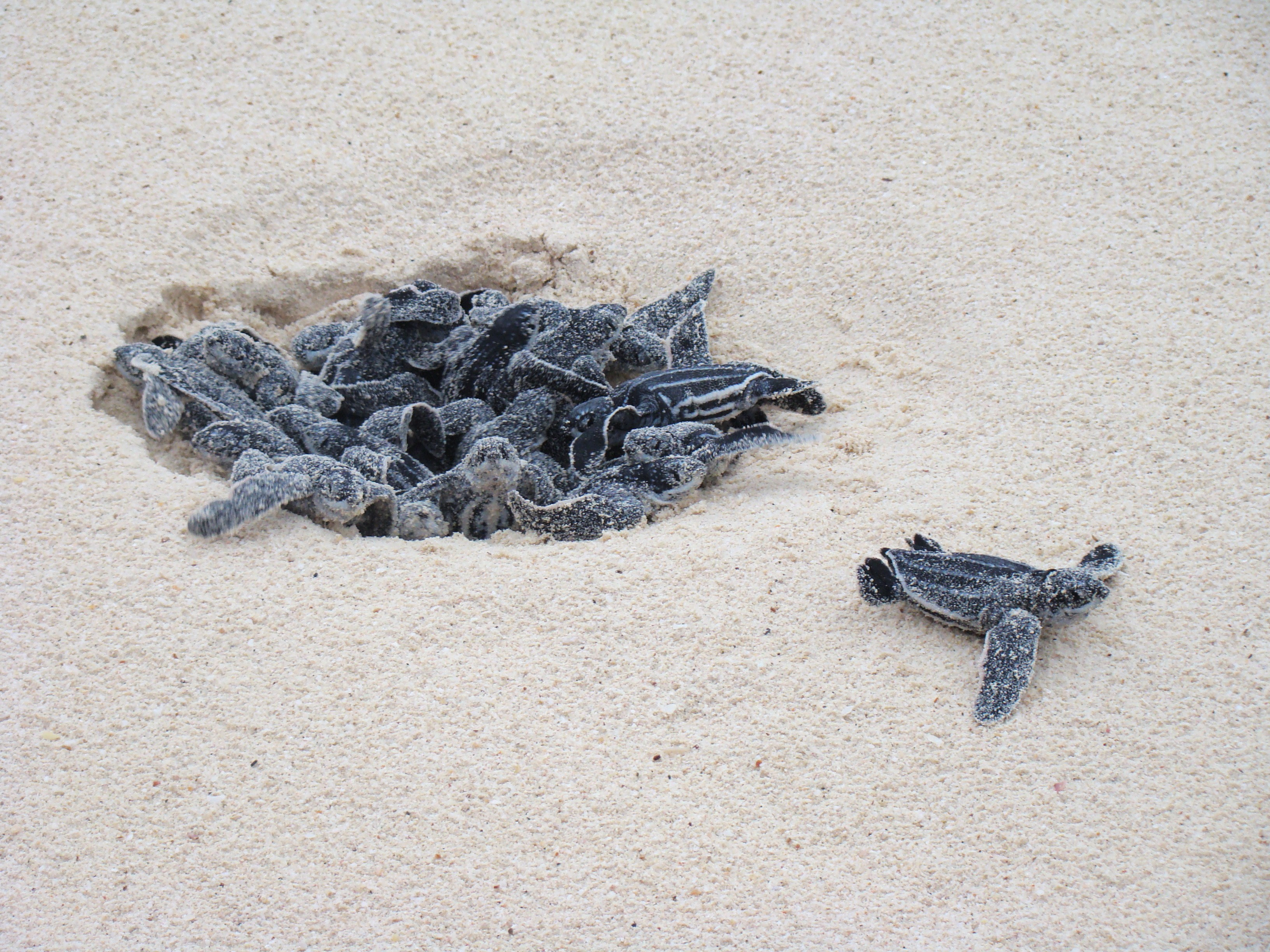
Leatherback hatchlings

All sea turtles species are endangered, including Leatherback, Loggerhead, Green and the Hawksbill, which are nocturnal wild life on Aruba. Artificial lighting can deter adult females from nesting or disorient emerging hatchlings, causing them to venture inland where they risk dehydration or harm.

International Dark-Sky Association-Aruba, a non-profit organization, aims to safeguard dark skies from light pollution. Over the past decade, the closure of the San Nicolas refinery has enabled the recovery of flora and fauna, while reducing light pollution, making the night sky brighter. However, the preservation of ecosystems faces increasing challenges with the expansion of the tourism zone and the construction of a new hotel in the southeast part of the island, Seroe Colorado.

==== Over-tourism ====
Over-tourism in Aruba is influenced by several key factors:

1. Tourism ecological stress: This factor highlights the environmental impact of tourism. As tourism intensity and density increase, ecological pressure accelerates after crossing a critical threshold.
2. Tourism supply chain: It considers the impact of increased airlift, accommodations (lodging), and labor on over-tourism.
3. Tourism architectural style: This aspect examines the concentration and design of cruise and accommodation infrastructures in specific geographic areas or coastal zones.
4. Tourism export specialization: Involves the export of tourism-related goods and services, including investments, earnings, revenues, and promotional activities.
5. International tourism market diversity: A diverse tourism market is inversely related to over-tourism, meaning that greater market diversity is associated with less intense over-tourism.

Implications to reduce over-tourism:

- Aruba's economic and environmental policy must consider tourism as an indicator for its Sustainable Development Goals (SDG).
- Conserve its scarce and fragile natural resources by limiting over-tourism and accommodation infrastructure (e.g., hotel rooms, timeshare rooms, condominiums, and guest houses).
- Political economy is often marked by social exclusion and extraction rather than social inclusion and regeneration: de-marginalization and safeguarding of community well-being and agency by transitioning towards community-driven policy and development.
- Ecotourism should benefit the environment and the local community. Despite the publicized commitment to becoming a sustainable tourism destination, the actual political agendas in place prioritize the sustaining of a tourism industry. This emphasis has overshadowed social rights and responsibilities, effectively diminishing the role of government and civic organizations in governing for the overall well-being of society, both in the present and for the future.
- Increase tourism market diversification
- Focus on long-term sustainable tourism by reducing bias towards short-term tourism promotion, expansion, and growth.

Over-tourism is a complicated issue, but it essentially boils down to a lack of responsible tourism management and policies by both public and private entities. This problem is exacerbated by the exclusion of local communities and civic society from important tourism decisions and developments. As a result, tourism has expanded without proper oversight, leading to various negative consequences.

== Human geography ==
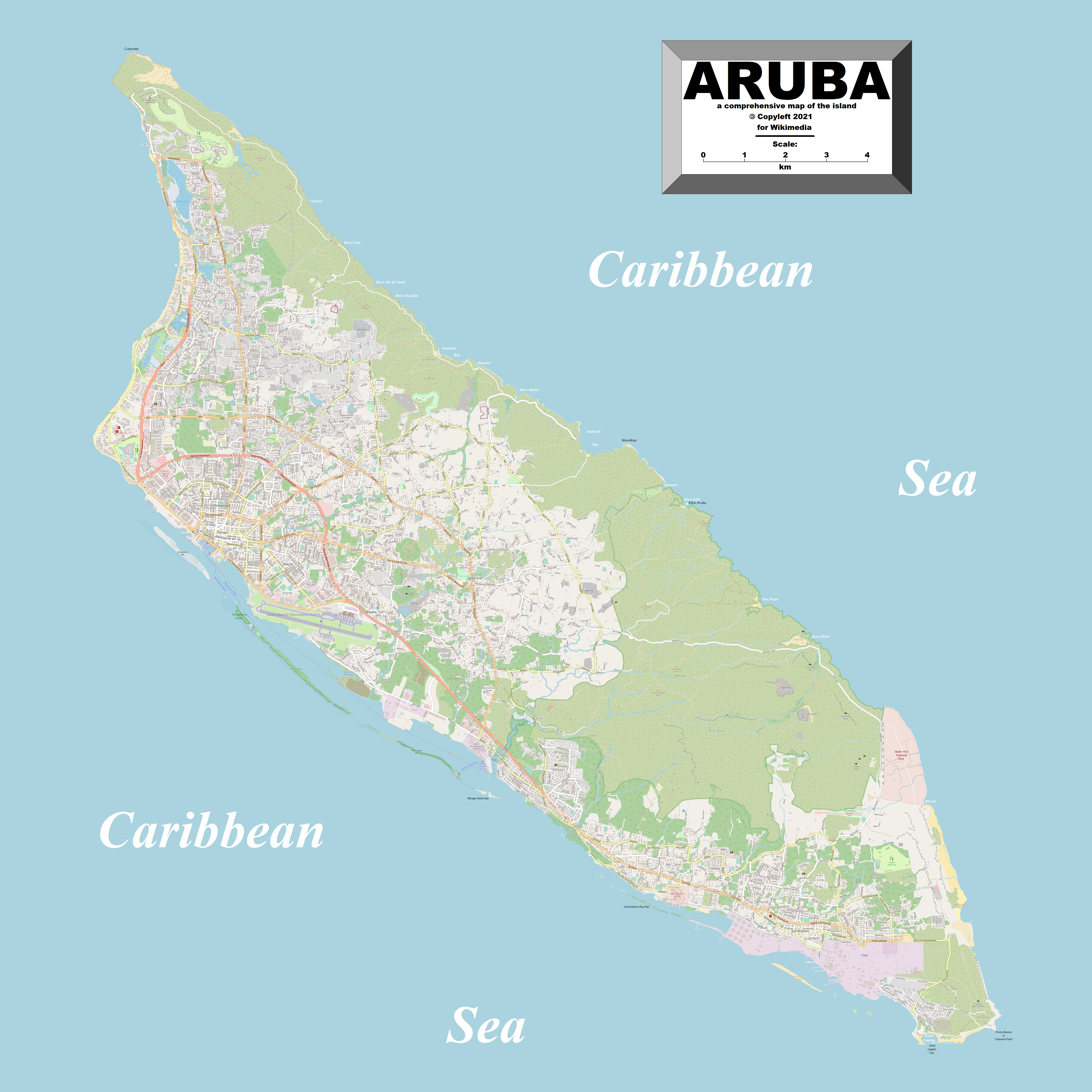
Enlargeable, detailed map of Aruba

Aruba is a constituent country within the Kingdom of the Netherlands, with the largest settlement being Oranjestad, with a population of 28,372 (2020). Starting from the 1960s, Aruba's population grew significantly because of two main factors: the arrival of workers for the oil refining industry and later, the tourism industry. It's estimated that at least 45% of the population in Aruba was born in another country.

According to the Geographical Address Classification Aruba (GAC), developed by the Central Bureau of Statistics Aruba (CBS), this classification system has three levels, region, zone, and street/bario. Aruba is divided into eight regions and 55 zones:

1. Noord/Tanki Leendert
2. Oranjestad West
3. Oranjestad East
4. Paradera
5. Santa Cruz
6. Savaneta
7. San Nicolas North
8. San Nicolas South

=== Cultural geography ===
==== Language distribution ====
According to the 2020 Census, 43.2% of Aruba's total population exclusively speaks Papiamento in their households. Among Aruba's 8 regions, 5 have over 50% of the population using only Papiamento at home, with Oranjestad East having the highest percentage at 56.6%, and San Nicolas South the lowest at 23.4%. Additionally, the Census indicates that 18.9% of the population reported Papiamento and Spanish as the two primary languages spoken in their households. In the regions Noord/Tanki Leendert and Oranjestad East, one in four persons speaks Papiamento and Spanish in the household, while San Nicolas North has the lowest percentage at 8.9%.

Census data also reveals that 9.4% of the population indicated that Papiamento and English were the two mostly spoken languages in the household. San Nicolas South and San Nicolas North are the 2 regions with the highest percentages of the population that speak Papiamento and English in the household at 28.7% and 12.3%, respectively. Papiamento and English are least spoken in households of persons living in the region of Santa Cruz (4.6%).

Additionally, the Census shows that 6.8% of Aruba's population speaks Papiamento and Dutch in their households. In all 8 regions, the percentage of the population that speaks these two languages at home is below 10%, with San Nicolas North having the lowest percentage at 1.5%.

Finally, the results of the 2020 Census revealed that in 18.6% of Aruba's households, Papiamento is not one of the two most spoken languages. At a regional level, nearly one third of the population in San Nicolas South (30.6%) indicated that Papiamento is not one of the two most spoken languages in their household. Conversely, in Paradera, the percentage of the population indicating that Papiamento is not one of the two most spoken languages in their household is the lowest at 11.6%. In total, in Paradera, 85.2% of the population speaks Papiamento at home, either exclusively or in combination with another language.

Census 2020: Language distribution per region in percentage
Nr.	Regions	Papiamento	Papiamento Spanish	Papiamento English	Papiamento Dutch
1	Noord/Tanki Leendert	31.2	25.3	9.4	9.7
2	Oranjestad West	27.3	28.3	10.7	6.2
3	Oranjestad East	56.6	11.3	5.7	5.0
4	Paradera	51.3	17.5	6.9	9.5
5	Santa Cruz	52.0	20.4	4.6	7.7
6	Savaneta	51.5	12.1	8.4	3.3
7	San Nicolas North	53.0	8.9	12.3	1.5
8	San Nicolas South	23.4	11.9	28.7	3.2
	National Average	43.2	18.9	9.4	6.8

=== Tourism geography ===
Currently, Aruba has a tourism intensity of 17 visitors per capita, marking a 5.6 increase since 1995. The island also experiences high tourism density, with over 10,000 visitors per square kilometer.

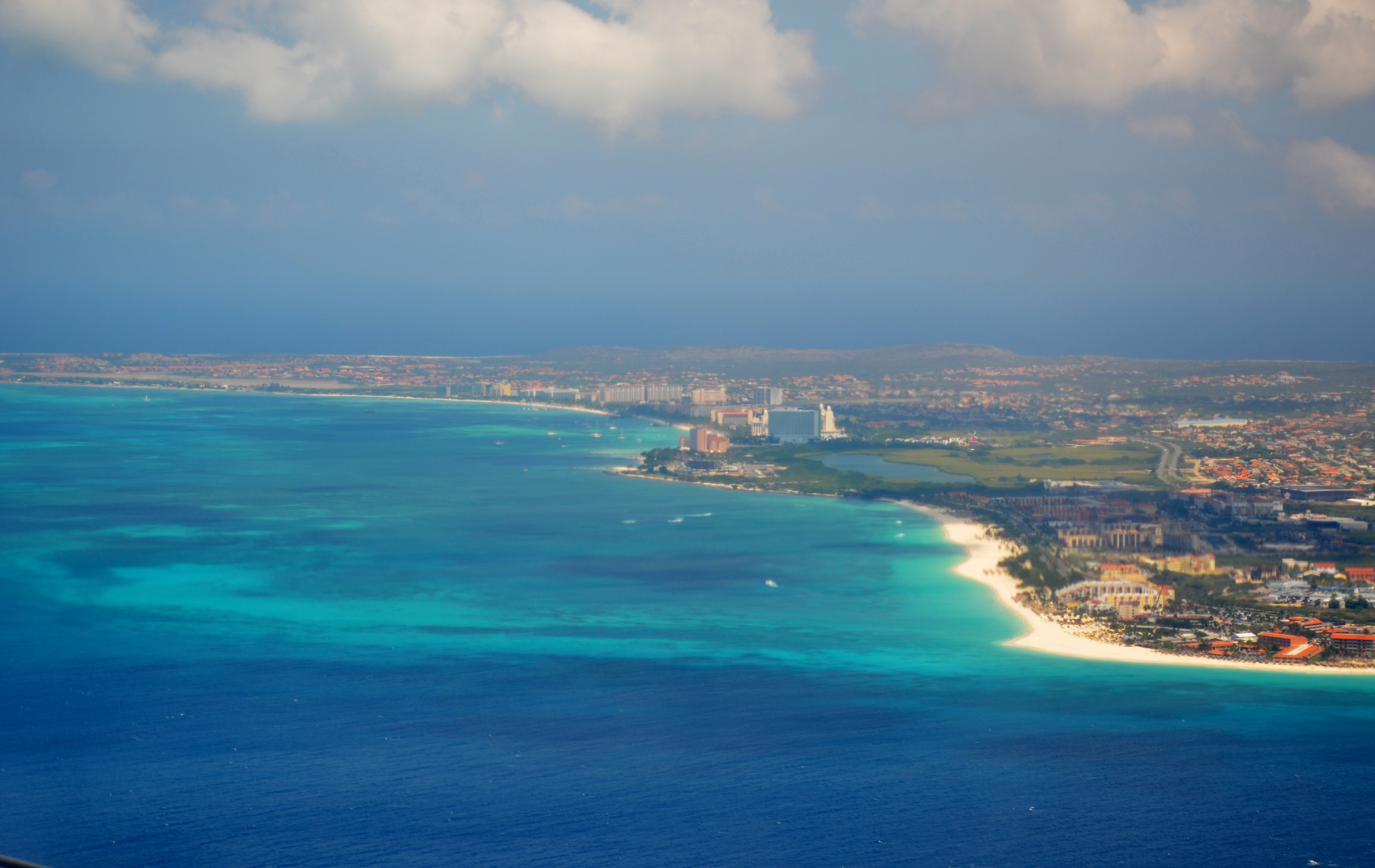
Partial view of tourism region along the northwestern coastline

Most of Aruba's tourism facilities are concentrated along the northwest coastline, with approximately 860 rooms per square kilometer. This represents a significant 103% growth in less than two decades. While Aruba is a small island, there were relatively few large-scale tourism activities and infrastructure developments in other geographical areas from 1995 to 2019.

The designated tourism zone, established in the late 1980s, covers about 16% of the island's total land area. Currently, there are around 14,000 accommodation units, including hotels, timeshares, condominiums, villas, guesthouses, and rental apartments. Accommodation growth was primarily driven by hotels and timeshares until the early 2000s. However, in the last decade, the construction of condominiums, guesthouses, and rental apartments has increased by 51%, adding to existing infrastructural pressures and coastal resort density levels.

Locals are concerned about the impact of the growing number of tourism-focused properties and accommodations on Aruba's fragile infrastructure and ecological environment. In the bustling Palm Beach on the west coast, there will be 4,000 more accommodations, including a new hotel near the Bubali Plas nature reserve, St. Regis Hotel, Embassy Suites, Hyatt Place Hotel, Radisson Blu Hotel, and boutique hotels in Port City, Oranjestad. Turning to the untouched east coast of the island, plans include the Secrets Aruba all-inclusive hotel with 600 rooms and a second hotel with 300 rooms. Additionally, there are two boutique hotels in the pipeline, each featuring 40 rooms.
