= Liolaemus calliston =

Scientific classification
- Kingdom: Animalia
- Phylum: Chordata
- Class: Reptilia
- Order: Squamata
- Suborder: Iguania
- Family: Liolaemidae
- Genus: Liolaemus
- Species: L. calliston

Binomial name
- Liolaemus calliston Avila, Fulvio-Perez, Minoli, Medina, Sites, & Morando, 2017

Species of lizard

Liolaemus calliston is a species of lizard in the family Liolaemidae. It is native to Argentina.
