= Liolaemus cyaneinotatus =

Conservation status
- Data Deficient (IUCN 3.1)

Scientific classification
- Kingdom: Animalia
- Phylum: Chordata
- Class: Reptilia
- Order: Squamata
- Suborder: Iguania
- Family: Liolaemidae
- Genus: Liolaemus
- Species: L. cyaneinotatus

Binomial name
- Liolaemus cyaneinotatus Martinez, Avila, Perez, Perez, Sites, & Morando, 2011

Species of lizard

Liolaemus cyaneinotatus is a species of lizard in the family Liolaemidae. It is endemic to Neuquén Province, Argentina. It can grow to 59 mm (2.3 in) in snout–vent length.
