= Liolaemus crandalli =

Scientific classification
- Kingdom: Animalia
- Phylum: Chordata
- Class: Reptilia
- Order: Squamata
- Suborder: Iguania
- Family: Liolaemidae
- Genus: Liolaemus
- Species: L. crandalli

Binomial name
- Liolaemus crandalli Avila, Medina, Perez, Morando, Sites, & Morando, 2015

Species of lizard

Liolaemus crandalli is a species of lizard in the family Liolaemidae. It is native to Argentina.
