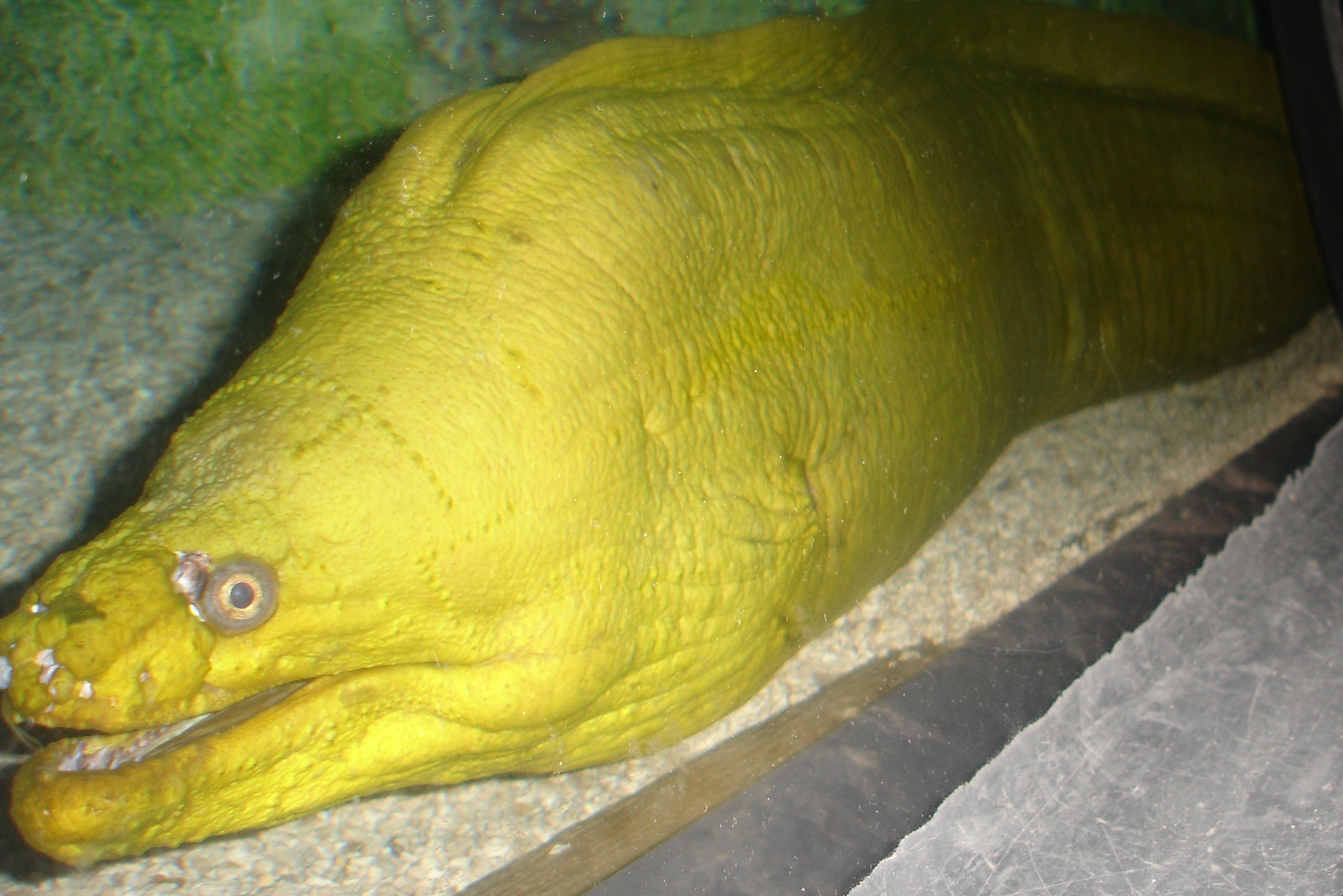
- At the ABQ BioPark Aquarium

Conservation status
- Least Concern (IUCN 3.1)

Scientific classification
- Kingdom: Animalia
- Phylum: Chordata
- Class: Actinopterygii
- Division: Teleostei
- Order: Anguilliformes
- Family: Muraenidae
- Genus: Gymnothorax
- Species: G. funebris

Binomial name
- Gymnothorax funebris Ranzani, 1840

= Green moray =

Species of eel

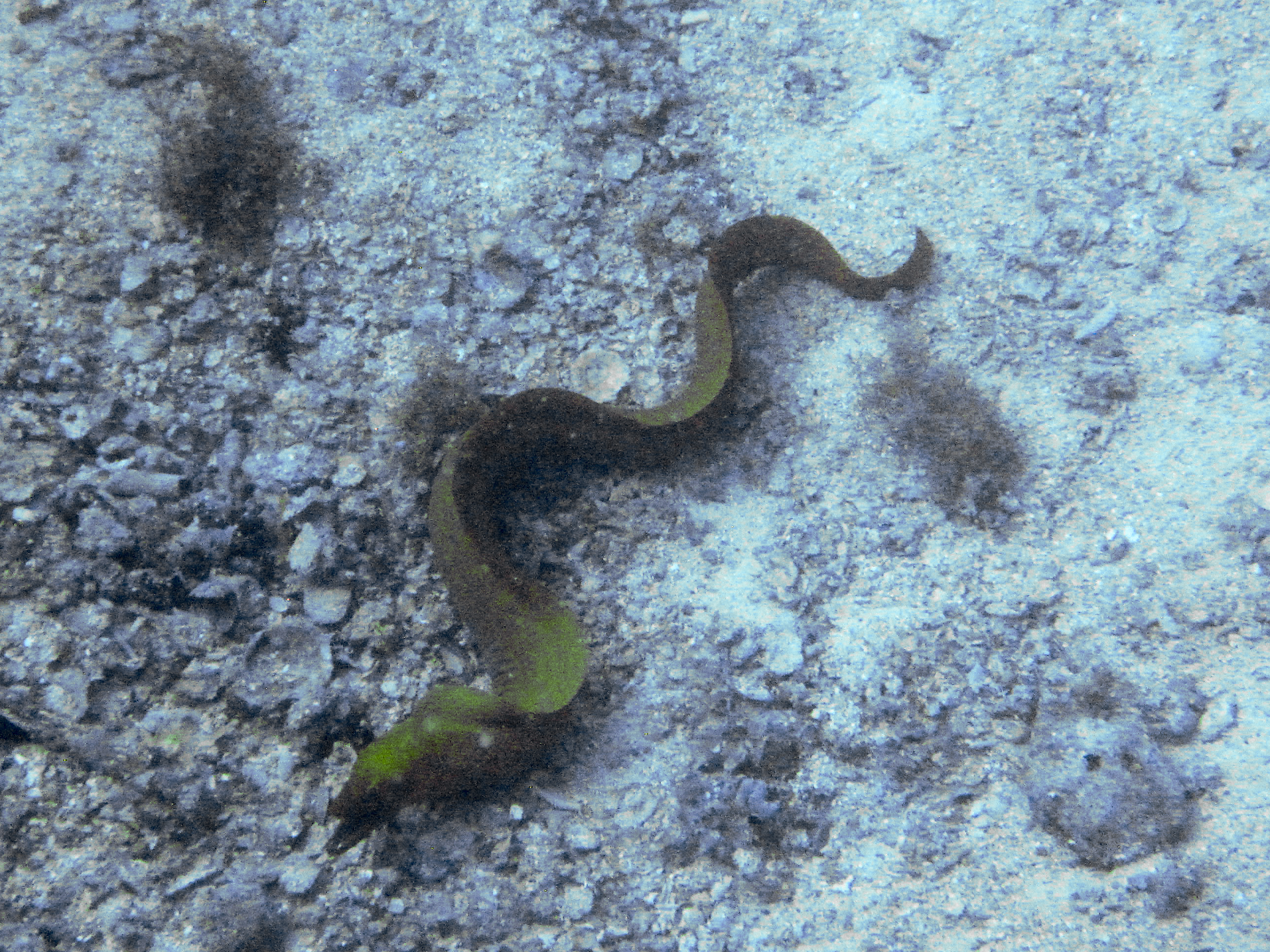
A green moray on the sand bed at 110' near the artificial reef Eagle in the Florida Keys National Marine Sanctuary

The green moray (Gymnothorax funebris) is a moray eel of the family Muraenidae, found in the western Atlantic Ocean from Long Island, New York, to Bermuda, to the northern Gulf of Mexico and to Brazil, at depths down to 40 m (130 ft). With a length up to 2.5 m (8.2 ft), it is the largest moray species of the tropical Atlantic and one of the largest species of moray eels known.

The common name "green moray" is also sometimes used to refer to the yellow moray, G. prasinus. Its green colour comes from a protective layer of mucus secreted by its specialized goblet cells, much like other species of morays. Underneath this mucus layer, the green moray eel is a darker color as can be seen in preserved specimens.

Green morays are typically not eaten and can cause ciguatera fish poisoning. Though the green moray is not considered endangered, moray eels in general are understudied and often undercounted by traditional visual surveys. The green moray is rated as least concern by the IUCN, with no notable threats beyond occasional capture for public aquaria.

== Behavior ==
=== Feeding ===
Fish, crabs, other crustaceans and cephalopods (like cuttlefish) have been reported as gut contents in green morays. Many moray eels cooperate with other fish during hunting, and Brazilian snapper (Lutjanus alexandrei) appear to recruit green morays while foraging among mangroves.

=== Movement patterns ===
A 2021 survey used acoustic transmitters to track 16 green morays in the mangrove estuary of Salt River Bay, St. Croix. Green morays of this area appear to be mostly nocturnal; 10 were detected more often at night, three in the day, and three were too elusive to analyze reliably. Most eels had a home range averaging 5.8 hectares (14 acres), with no correlation between an eel's size and range. Two had broader ranges without a clear center of activity, and one moved to an adjacent bay during study.

Six eels moved towards offshore reefs and rocky submarine canyons, exiting the survey area. Each eel's movement took place over a single night in winter or spring, though it was preceded by some broader exploration of their bay of residence. The eels that migrated were significantly larger (but not necessarily more mature) than those which did not.
