= Liolaemus avilae =

Conservation status
- Least Concern (IUCN 3.1)

Scientific classification
- Kingdom: Animalia
- Phylum: Chordata
- Class: Reptilia
- Order: Squamata
- Suborder: Iguania
- Family: Liolaemidae
- Genus: Liolaemus
- Species: L. avilae

Binomial name
- Liolaemus avilae Breitman, Parra, Pérez & Sites, 2011

Species of lizard

Liolaemus avilae is a species of lizard in the family Liolaemidae. The species is endemic to Argentina.

== Etymology ==
The specific name, avilae, is in honor of Argentinian herpetologist Luciano Javier Avila.

== Geographic range ==
L. avilae is found in southern Argentina, in Santa Cruz Province.

== Habitat ==
The preferred natural habitat of L. avilae is grassland, at altitudes of 1,000–1,400 m (3,300–4,600 ft).

== Reproduction ==
L. avilae is viviparous. Litter size may be three to six newborns.
