= Liolaemus galactostictos =

Scientific classification
- Kingdom: Animalia
- Phylum: Chordata
- Class: Reptilia
- Order: Squamata
- Suborder: Iguania
- Family: Liolaemidae
- Genus: Liolaemus
- Species: L. galactostictos

Binomial name
- Liolaemus galactostictos Avila, Vrdoljak, Medina, Massini, Fulvio-Perez, Sites, & Morando, 2021

Species of lizard

Liolaemus galactostictos is a species of lizard in the family Liolaemidae. It is native to Argentina.
