= Marine Park Aruba =

Marine reserves of Aruba

- Parke Marino Aruba
- Map of Aruban marine protected areas (blue) and Arikok National Park (green).
- Location: MPA Arikok; MPA Seroe Colorado; MPA Mangel Halto; MPA Oranjestad reef islands
- Area: 60.2 square kilometres (23.2 mi^{2})
- Established: 2019
- Governing body: Aruba National Park Foundation

The Marine Park Aruba are marine protected areas (MPAs) situated around the island of Aruba. This nature reserve was established on December 21, 2018 and brought under the management of Fundacion Parke Nacional Aruba (FPNA, Aruba National Park Foundation) on April 16, 2019.

MPAs consists of four designated marine reserves, which are legally protected due to their vast biodiversity. These include the coastal waters adjacent to Arikok National Park (16.5 km^{2} (6.4 mi^{2})), the coastal water around the "Eastern Cape" of Seroe Colorado (18.7 km^{2} (7.2 mi^{2})), the coastal water along Mangel Halto, Isla di Oro, Santo Largo, with coastal mangroves (16 km^{2} (6.2 mi^{2})), and the reef islands of Oranjestad from the lagoon next to Governor's Bay Beach up to Punta Brabo, excluding the cruise ship passage channel (9 km^{2} (3.5 mi^{2})). These marine reserves (0.2% of Aruba's territorial waters) serve as natural habitats for coral reefs, seagrasses, and mangrove forests and act as breeding and foraging areas for sea turtles, seabirds, and sharks.

The designated marine parks on Aruba include some of the island's most valuable reefs. However, the reef sections between MPA Seroe Colorado and MPA Mangel Halto, and particularly the area between MPA Mangel Halto and MPA Oranjestad, host some of Aruba's best remaining reefs along the leeward shore. While these areas are significant for reef preservation, they are not part of the MPAs. To avoid impacting economic activities, these areas are left unprotected. Protecting them would disrupt the operations of cruise ships and the container port. Nevertheless, in Bonaire, where several marine ecosystems have been safeguarded since 1979, it's feasible to host cruise ships.

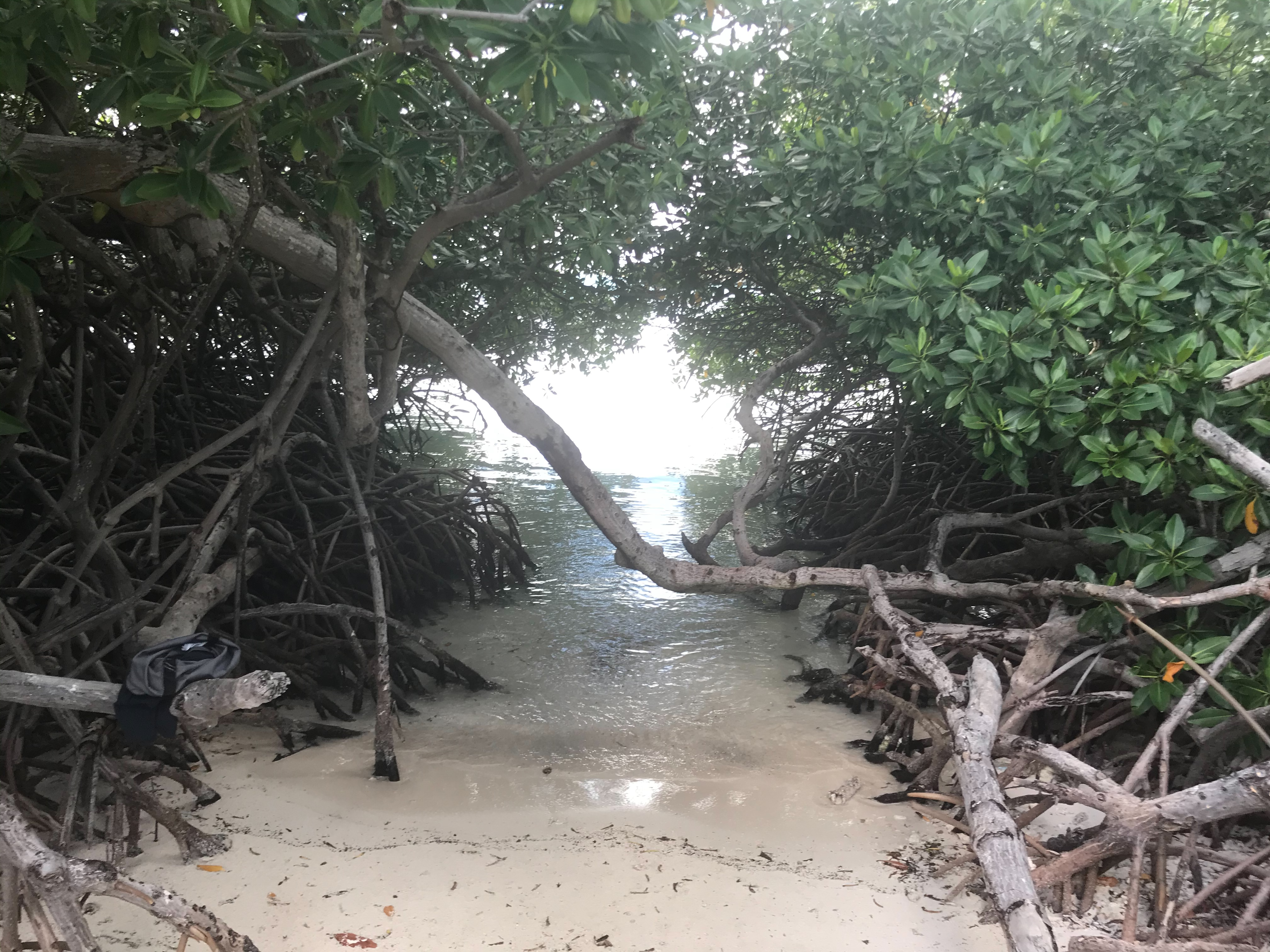
Mangrove on the coast of Mangel Halto

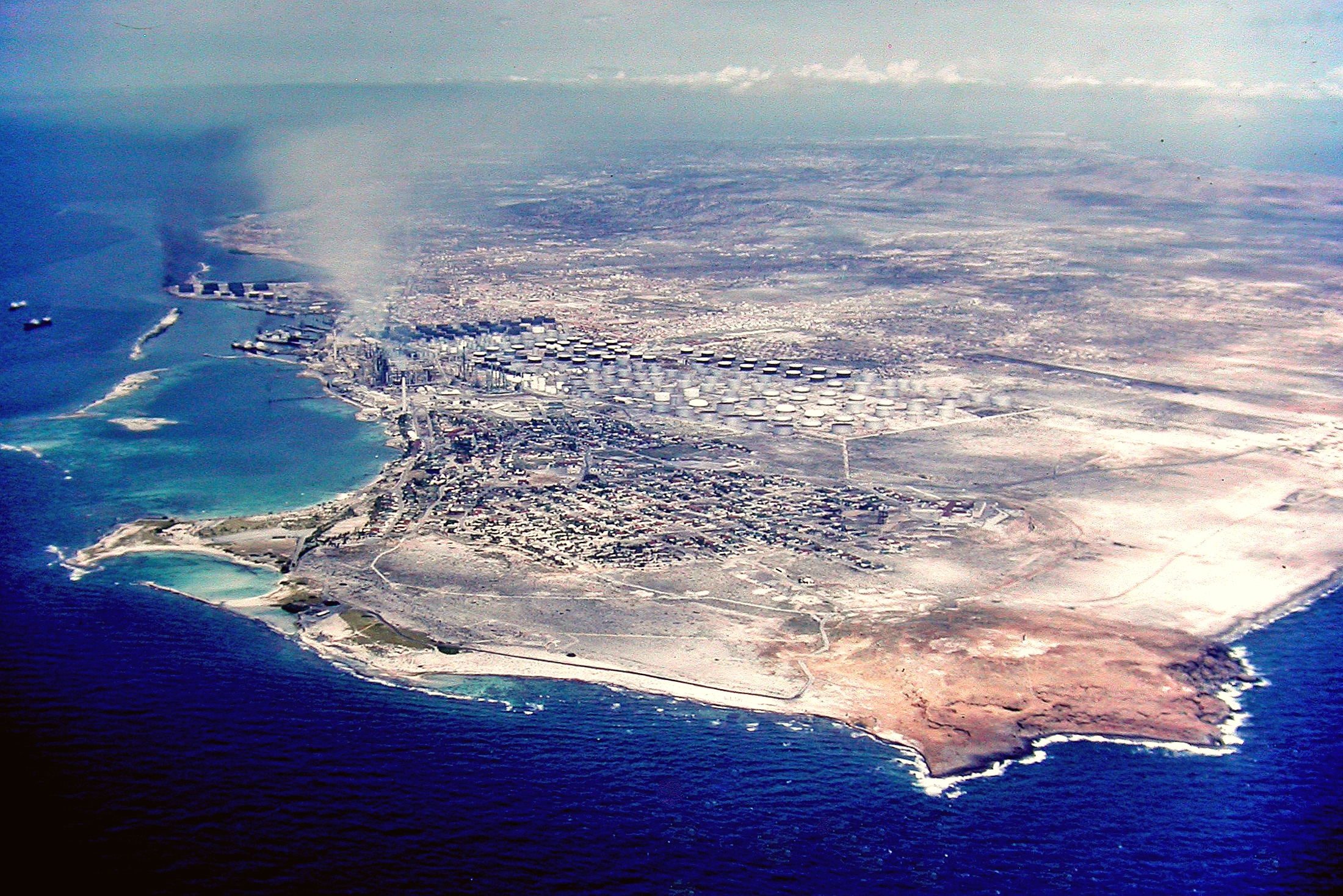
Aerial view of Seroe Colorado
