= Mangel Halto =

Lagoon in Savaneta, Aruba

- Location within the Caribbean
- Map of MPA Mangel Halto (blue) and Arikok National Park (green).
- Coordinates: 12.464917°N 69.969528°W
- Dive type: Shore; Wreck; Snorkeling; Reef
- Depth range: 16 to 25 m (52 to 82 ft)
- Average visibility: 20 m (66 ft)
- Entry type: Shore; Boat
- Bottom composition: Sand and coral
- Water: Salt
- Nearby sites: Hole in the wall (0.12 km (0.075 mi)); Isla di Oro (1.35 km (0.84 mi)); De Palm slope (1.58 km (0.98 mi)); Santo largo reef (2.24 km (1.39 mi))

Mangel Halto is a shallow lagoon and recreational dive site near Pos Chikito in Aruba. In 2019, it was designated as a marine reserve within the Marine Park Aruba, with management overseen by the National Park Foundation of Aruba.

== Geography ==
=== Coastal features ===
Mangel Halto is nestled amidst the mangrove forests and boasts is a tranquil beach that stretches approximately 600 metres (0.37 mi) in length. To the north of the beach lies the natural reserve known as Spaans Lagoen. The calm and shallow lagoon make it an ideal spot for activities like snorkeling, kayaking, and SUP boarding.

==== Inside the bay ====
Mangel Halto, Tugboat is a bowl-shaped dive site with the wreck of an old tugboat, Kappel, at a depth of 12 metres (39 ft). Suitable for beginner snorkelers.

==== Outside the cut ====
Mangel Halto, Outside is a sloping coastal reef dive site located just beyond the reef where the ocean depth reaches 110 metres (360 ft). There are two cuts on the left side of the reef, these cuts are used to get access beyond the reef. The deepest cut is marked by a white buoy. The left cut is more shallow and less chance for boat traffic. This area is suitable for advanced snorkelers.

The reef ecosystem serves as a habitat for octopuses, Green moray, sea turtles and barracudas.

=== Geomorphology ===
The area around Mangel Halto features limestone cliffs from the Late Pleistocene Lower Terrace mixed with reef rubble.

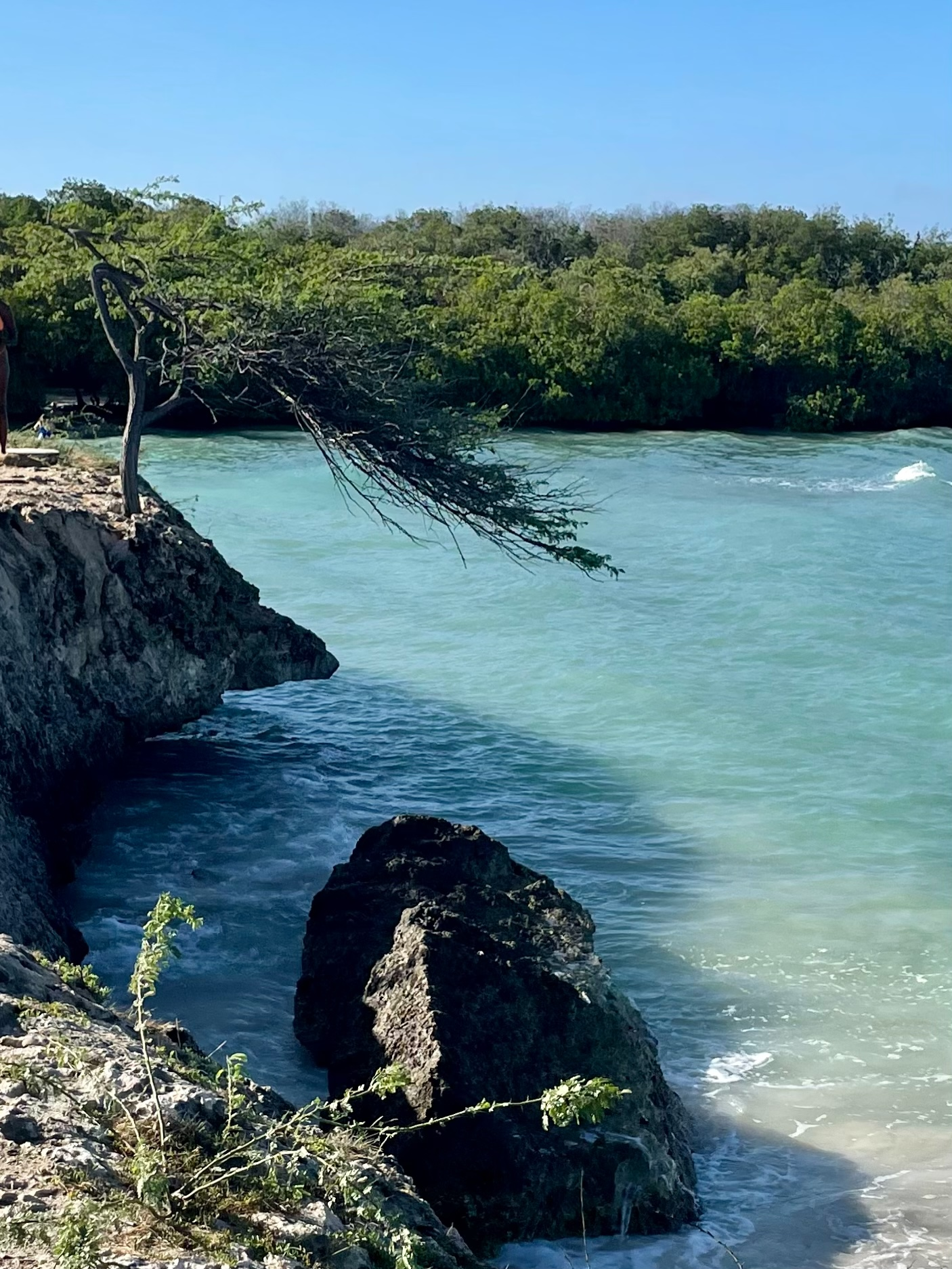
Limestone cliffs

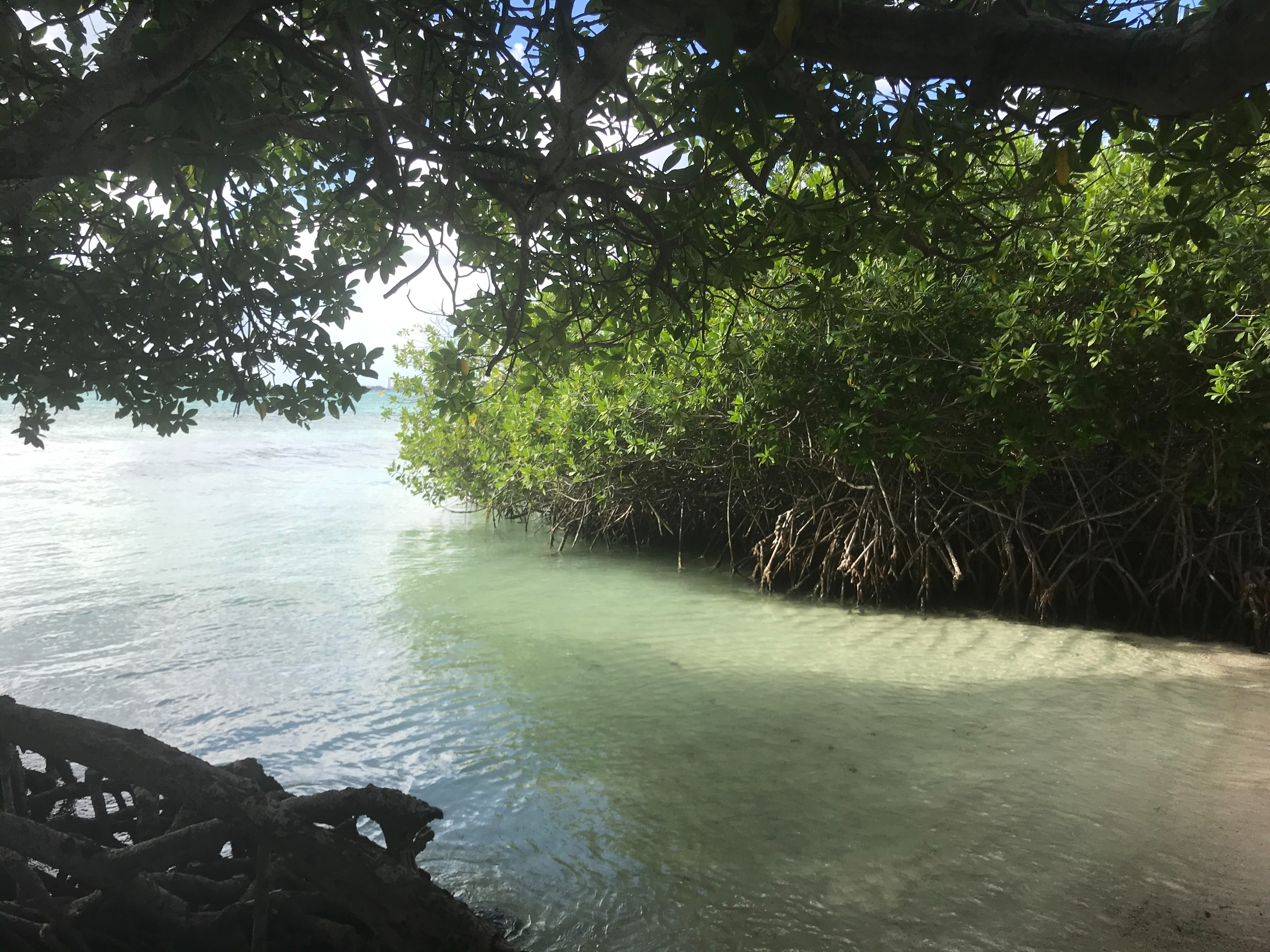
Mangrove forest
