= Alexandresaurus =

Scientific classification
- Kingdom: Animalia
- Phylum: Chordata
- Class: Reptilia
- Order: Squamata
- Family: Gymnophthalmidae
- Genus: Alexandresaurus; Rodrigues, Pellegrino, Dixo, Verdade, Pavan, Argôlo & Sites, 2007
- Species: A. camacan

Binomial name
- Alexandresaurus camacan Rodrigues, Pellegrino, Dixo, Verdade, Pavan, Argôlo & Sites, 2007

Genus of lizards

Alexandresaurus is a genus of lizard in the family Gymnophthalmidae. The genus is monotypic, i.e., it contains only one species, Alexandresaurus camacan. The species is endemic to Brazil.

== Etymology ==
The generic name, Alexandresaurus, is in honor of Brazilian naturalist Alexandre Rodrigues Ferreira.

The specific name, camacan, is in honor of the Camacan, an extinct indigenous people of Brazil.

== Geographic range ==
A. camacan is found in the Brazilian state of Bahia.

== Description ==
A. camacan is large for its family. Maximum recorded snout-to-vent length (SVL) is 7 cm (2.8 in). The tail is long, averaging about twice SVL.

== Reproduction ==
A. camacan is oviparous.
