= Alexandre Rodrigues Ferreira =

Portuguese naturalist, explorer (1756–1815)

- Born: 27 April 1756; Salvador, Brazil
- Died: 23 April 1815 (aged 58); Lisbon, Portugal
- Education: University of Coimbra
- Known for: Expedition to the interior of Brazil
- Scientific career
- Fields: Natural science, Exploration
- Workplaces: University of Coimbra; Museum of Ajuda; Royal Cabinet of Natural History

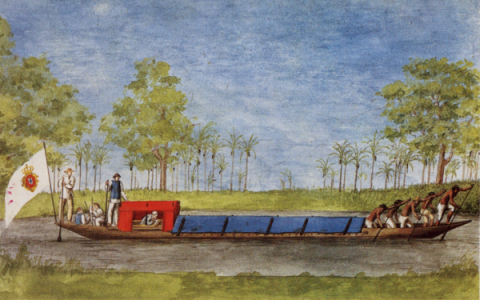
"Philosophical Voyage" of Alexandre Rodrigues Ferreira c. 1792

Alexandre Rodrigues Ferreira (27 April 1756 – 23 April 1815) was a Portuguese naturalist born in Brazil. He undertook an extensive journey which crossed the interior of the Amazon Basin to Mato Grosso, between 1783 and 1792. During this journey, he described the agriculture, flora, fauna, and native inhabitants.

== Life and work ==
Born in Salvador, Bahia, the son of the merchant Manuel Rodrigues Ferreira, Ferreira began his studies at the Convent of Mercês, in Bahia, which gave him his first orders in 1768.

He then studied law and then natural philosophy and mathematics at the University of Coimbra, where he received his baccalaureate at age 22. He continued his studies at the institution, where he studied natural history, and obtained his doctorate in 1779.

He then worked at the Royal Museum of Ajuda. On 22 March 1780, he was admitted as a corresponding member of the Portuguese Royal Academy of Sciences.

== Expedition to Brazil ==
At this time the colonial economy of Brazil was in a state of decadence, having exhausted the placer gold of Mato Grosso, Goiás, and, especially, Minas Gerais. For this reason, the queen Maria I of Portugal, desiring to know more about the central and north of the Brazilian colony, which at that point remained practically unexplored, in order to implement developmental measures, ordered Alexandre Rodrigues Ferreira, as a naturalist, to undertake a "philosophical voyage through the captaincies of Grão-Pará, Rio Negro, Mato Grosso e Cuiabá." The idea was to provide an impetus for economic exploration and enable conquest of disputed territory.

In 1783 the naturalist left his post at the Museum of Ajuda, and, in September, left for Brazil to describe, collect, prepare and remit to the Royal Museum of Lisbon samples of tools used by the local population, as well as local minerals, plants, and animals. He was also to write political and philosophical commentaries about what he saw in the places he passed through. This pragmatism was what separated this voyage from other, more scientific, voyages led by other naturalists who explored America.

With uncertain resources, he counted on two draftsmen or sketchers (riscadores), José Codina, about whom little is known, and José Joaquim Freire, who had an important position in the drawing house of the Museum of Ajuda and frequented the design halls of the Foundry of the Royal Army Arsenal. He was also served by a botanical gardener, Agostinho do Cabo. The voyage was undertaken under auspices of the Academy of Sciences in Lisbon, the Ministry of Business and Ultramarine Dominions, and was planned by the Italian naturalist Domenico Vandelli. It was originally planned to include four naturalists, but due to financial cuts, Ferreira was the only one, and on his shoulders lay the responsibilities of collecting species, classifying and preparing specimens for the return journey to Lisbon, and preparing studies about the agriculture and maps of the area.

In October 1783, he arrived in Belém do Pará on the Águia e Coração de Jesus ("Eagle and Heart of Jesus"). The following nine years were dedicated to crossing the central-north of Brazil, from the island of Marajó, Cametá, Baião, Pederneiras and Alcobaça.

He went up the Amazon River and the Rio Negro to the border with Spanish lands, and navigated up the Branco River to the mountain of Cananauaru. He went up the Madeira River and the Guaporé River to Vila Bela da Santíssima Trindade, then capital of Mato Grosso. He continued through the town of Cuiabá, crossing from the Amazon watershed into the marshes of Mato Grosso, in the Prata River watershed. He followed the Cuiabá, São Lourenço and Paraguai Rivers. He returned to Belém do Pará in January 1792.

He inventoried the flora and fauna, the indigenous communities and their customs, evaluated the economic opportunities and possible places for centers of population. His was the most important voyage of discovery in Brazil during the colonial period.

His "Diary of a Philosophical Voyage" (Diário da Viagem Filosófica) was published in the Revista do Instituto Histórico e Geográfico Brasileiro in 1887. The Division of Manuscripts of the National Library Foundation preserves in the Alexandre Rodrigues Ferreira Collection hundreds of documents from Philosophical Voyage, along with other papers relating to the Amazon from the 18th century.

== Remittance to Portugal ==
During all of the years of exploration of the hinterland, he ordered the material collected to be sent to the royal court. Upon discovering that all of the expenses had been covered by the captain, spending his daughter's dowry, he decided that it wouldn't do to embarrass her marriage, and married his daughter, Germana Pereira de Queiroz, himself on 16 September 1792.

He returned to Lisbon in January 1793, and dedicated the remainder of his life to metropolitan administration. He was named Official of the Secretary of State of Sea Commerce and Ultramarine Dominions. In 1794 he was awarded the Order of Christ and took a post as temporary director of the Royal Cabinet of Natural History and the Botanical Garden of the University of Coimbra. In the following year, he was nominated, in sequence, the Vice Director of the institution, Administrator of the Royal Farms, and Deputy of the Royal Junta of Commerce. He died in Lisbon.

The material provided by the Philosophical Voyage remained for more than a century unknown and unstudied by Portuguese scholars, not even by Ferreira himself. He never resumed work on the species and samples collected in Brazil, nor refined his records and studies of the journey, and much of the material was taken to Paris as war booty. There remains today, however, a rich archive of diaries, geographic, demographic and agricultural maps, correspondence, more than a thousand boards and records, today kept mainly in the National Library Foundation in Rio de Janeiro and the Museum Bocage in Lisbon.

== Legacy ==
Ferreira is commemorated in the scientific names of a genus of Brazilian lizard, Alexandresaurus, a species of Brazilian lizard, Loxopholis ferreirai, and in the specific name of the Brazilian snapper (Lutjanus alexandrei).

The Black Arowana Osteoglossum ferreirai is named after him.
