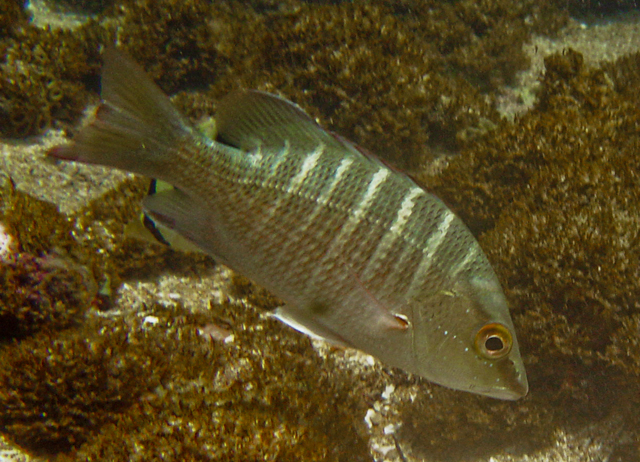
- Individual seen near Tamandaré

Scientific classification
- Kingdom: Animalia
- Phylum: Chordata
- Class: Actinopterygii
- Division: Teleostei
- Order: Acanthuriformes
- Family: Lutjanidae
- Genus: Lutjanus
- Species: L. alexandrei

Binomial name
- Lutjanus alexandrei R. L. Moura & Lindeman, 2007

= Brazilian snapper =

Species of fish

The Brazilian snapper, (Lutjanus alexandrei) is a species of snapper native to the tropical waters of the Atlantic off the coast of Brazil.

== Taxonomy ==
The Brazilian snapper was first formally described in 2007 by Brazilian marine biologist Rodrigo Leão de Moura and American marine scientist Kenyon C. Lindeman, with the type locality given as Camurupim Reef near Tamandaré in Pernambuco State, Brazil. The specific name honours pioneering Brazilian naturalist Alexandre Rodrigues Ferreira.

== Description ==
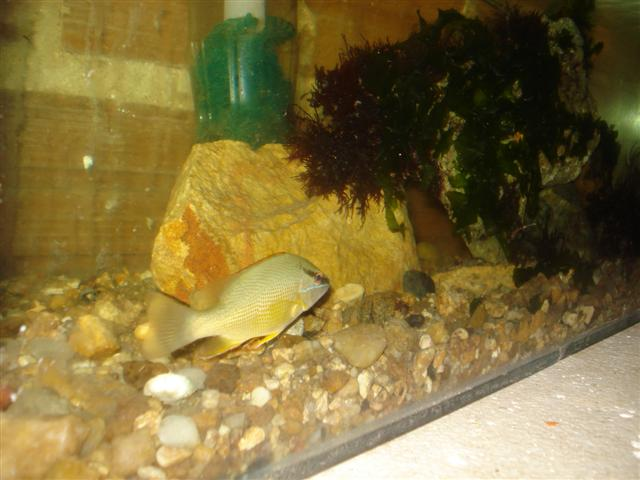
Captive individual

The Brazilian snapper has a relatively deep body with a mean depth around 40% of its standard length. It has a long, pointed snout and a large terminal mouth, which is protractile. A row of conical teeth is on each jaw, with the anterior pair in the upper jaw enlarged into fang-like teeth that are visible when the mouth is closed. Also, pairs of canine-like, pointed, conical teeth are in lower jaw. The vomerine teeth are arranged in an anchor-shaped patch, having an obvious extension behind its centre. The dorsal fin is continuous with 10 spines in its anterior portion and 14 soft rays in its posterior portion, a slight notch is at the boundary between the spiny and soft rayed parts of the fin. The anal fin has three spines and eight soft rays. The preoperculum is serrated and has a poorly developed notch and knob. This species is variable in colour, but normally they are reddish marked with more-or-less clear vertical bands on the body and sometimes a diagonal band over the eyes. The blue spots present on the faces of this species allow it to be identified in comparison with similar species; these run in an irregular line from the corner of the mouth to the edge of the operculum, with another a brief row behind the eye and a small number dispersed on the cheek. The maximum standard length recorded for this species is 24.3 cm (9.6 in) and the maximum published weight is 199.9 g (7.05 oz).

== Distribution and habitat ==
The Brazilian snapper is found in the western Atlantic Ocean, where it is endemic to the coast of Brazil. It has been recorded from the state of Maranhão to the southern coast of the state of Bahia in the Northeast Region. It can be found from the tidal shallows to a depth of 54 m (177 ft) on coral reefs, rocky shores, coastal lagoons with brackish water, mangroves, and other shallow-water habitats that have a mosaic of soft and hard substrates. Juveniles are more common in mamgroves and other shallow-water habitats, often in mixed schools with juvenile dog snapper (L. jocu).

== Biology ==
The Brazilian snapper, like other snappers, is a nocturnal predator, and the adults are found either solitarily or in groups on reefs during the day, often mixed with dog snappers.
