= Bubali Bird Sanctuary =

Wetland in Aruba in the Dutch Caribbean

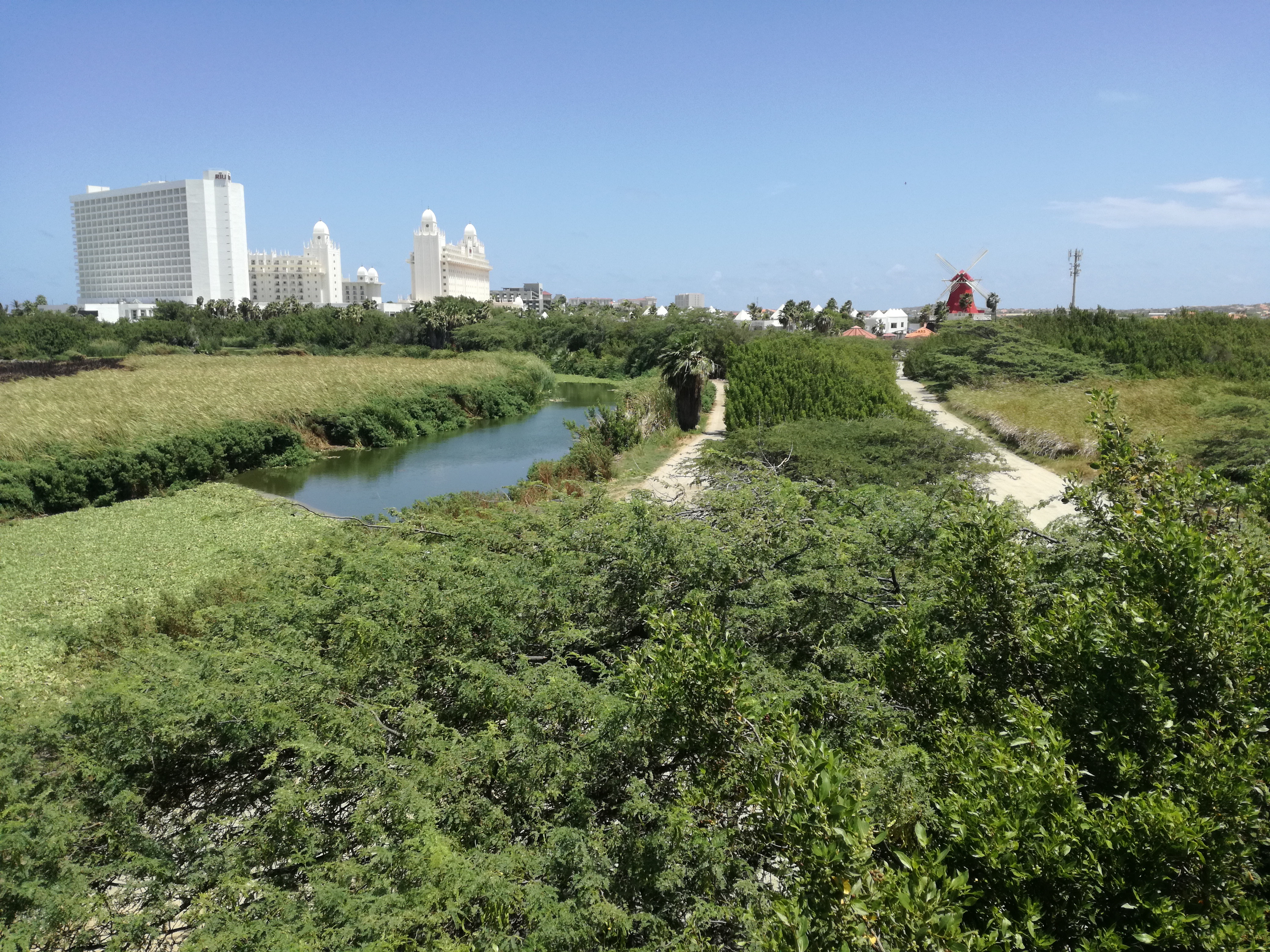

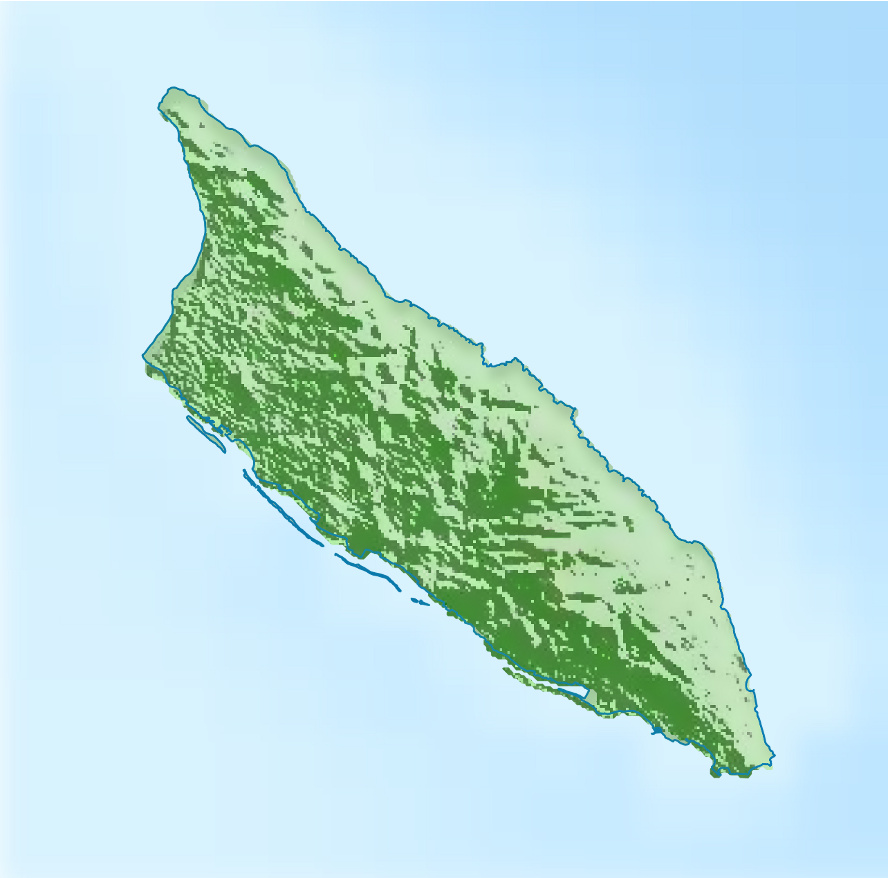
- Location within Aruba
- Location: Aruba
- Nearest city: Palm Beach
- Coordinates: 12°33′35″N 70°02′58″W
- Area: 0.2 km^{2} (0.077 sq mi)

The Bubali Bird Sanctuary (Dutch: Bubali vogelreservaat) form a 20 ha wetland area at the north-western end of the island of Aruba, a constituent country of the Dutch Caribbean. It has been identified as an Important Bird Area (IBA) by BirdLife International because it and its surrounding vegetation support populations of a variety of birds, including threatened and restricted-range species as well as large seasonal numbers of migratory waders and neotropical passerines. Originally created as a wastewater treatment facility, the wetland is threatened by encroachment of aquatic vegetation decreasing the area of open water.

== Birds ==
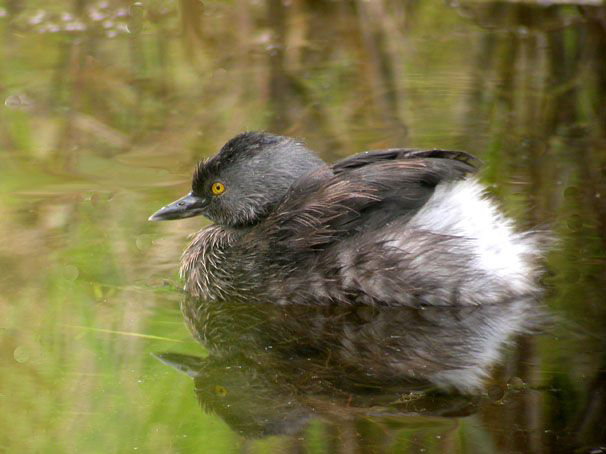
Least grebes breed in the IBA

Waterbirds nesting in the IBA include American coots, common moorhens, white-cheeked pintails, least and pied-billed grebes, and green herons. There is a large roost of neotropic cormorants. The desert scrub vegetation along the seaward side provides habitat for nesting white-tailed nightjars, yellow warblers, burrowing owls, ruby-topaz hummingbirds, eared and common ground doves, and bananaquits.

== 2018 fire ==
On 10 September 2018, the Bubali Bird Sanctuary caught fire. The fire fighters managed to contain the fire by 3 AM, however 24% of the area was destroyed.
