= Liolaemus sitesi =

Conservation status
- Least Concern (IUCN 3.1)

Scientific classification
- Kingdom: Animalia
- Phylum: Chordata
- Class: Reptilia
- Order: Squamata
- Suborder: Iguania
- Family: Liolaemidae
- Genus: Liolaemus
- Species: L. sitesi

Binomial name
- Liolaemus sitesi Avila, Olave, Perez, Perez, & Morando, 2013

Species of lizard

Liolaemus sitesi is a species of lizard in the family Liolaemidae. It is native to Argentina.
