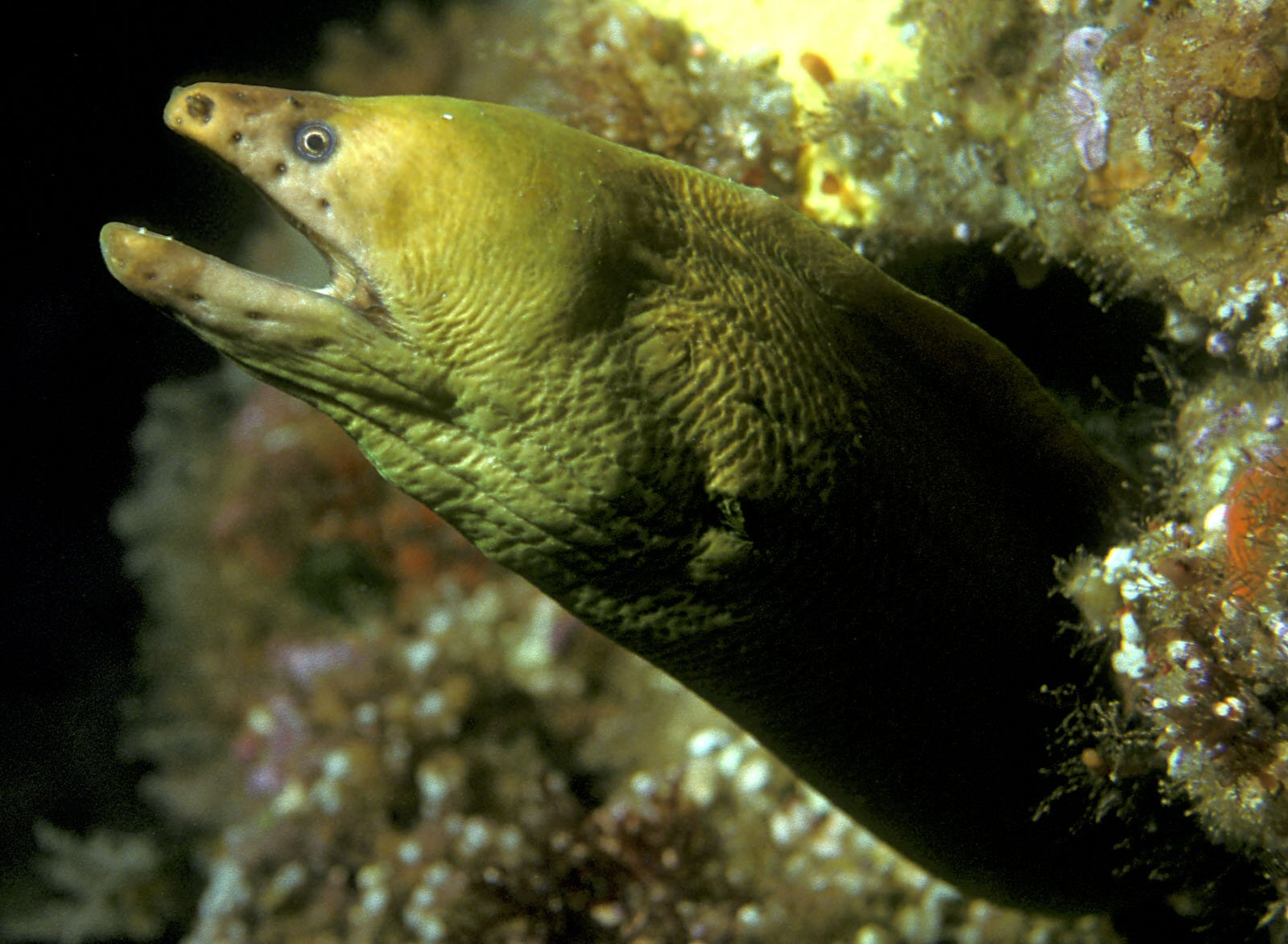

Scientific classification
- Kingdom: Animalia
- Phylum: Chordata
- Class: Actinopterygii
- Order: Anguilliformes
- Family: Muraenidae
- Genus: Gymnothorax
- Species: G. prasinus

Binomial name
- Gymnothorax prasinus (J. Richardson, 1848)

= Yellow moray =

Species of fish

The yellow moray (Gymnothorax prasinus) is a moray eel of the genus Gymnothorax, found in southern Australia and between North Cape and the Mahia Peninsula on the North Island of New Zealand.
