= Oranjestad Reef Islands =

Islands in Aruba in the Dutch Caribbean

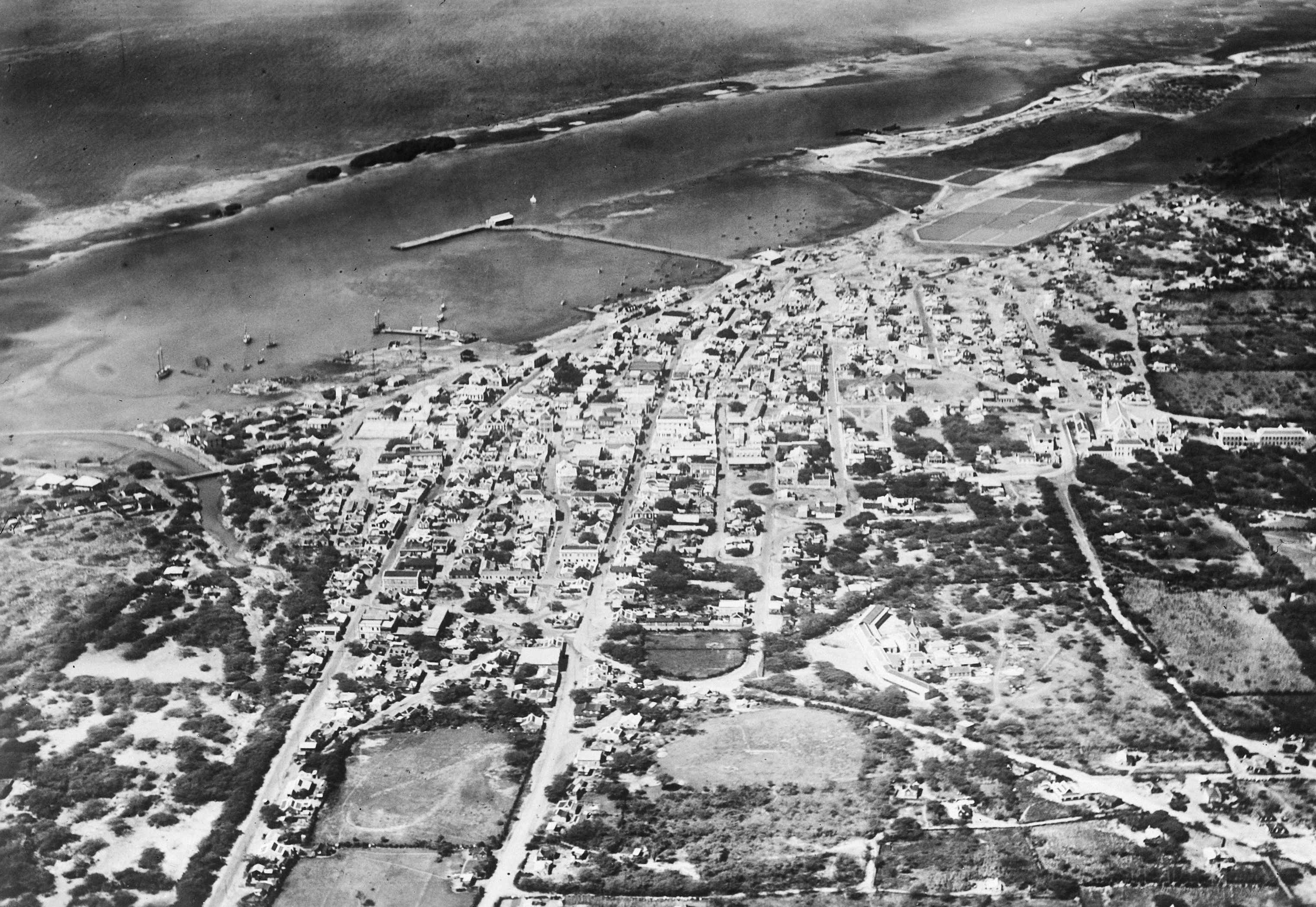
- Aerial picture of Oranjestad with Reef Islands

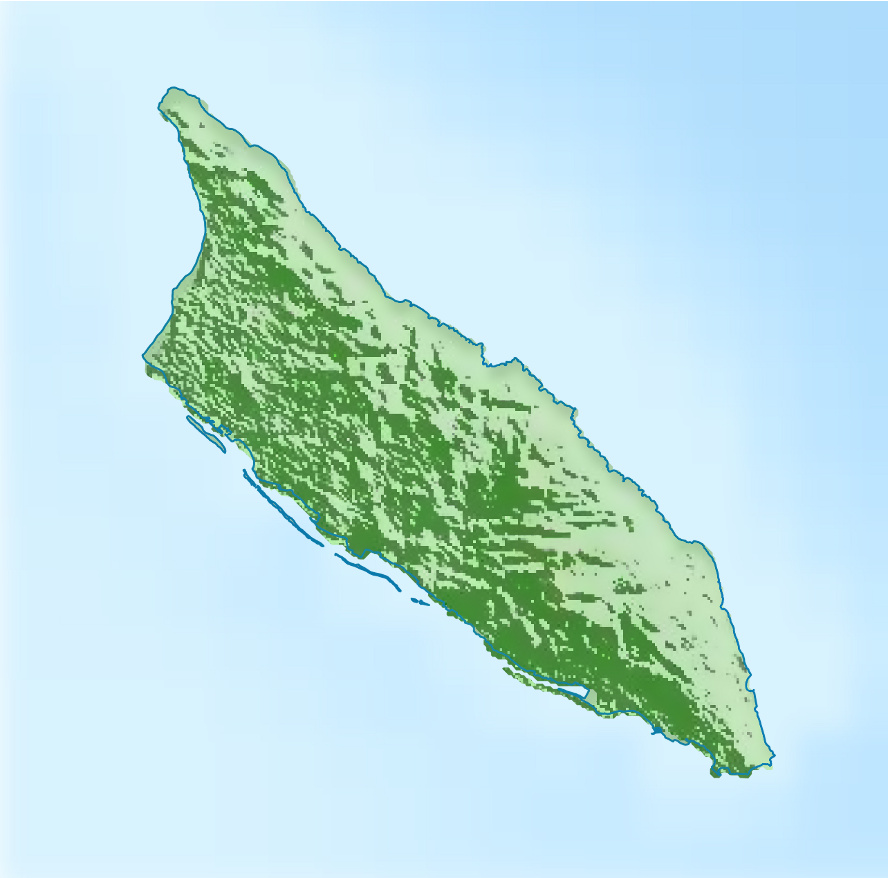
- Location within Aruba

Geography
- Location: Oranjestad, Aruba
- Coordinates: 12°30′34″N 70°02′21″W

The Oranjestad Reef Islands lie just off the western coast of the island of Aruba, a constituent island nation of the Kingdom of the Netherlands in the Dutch Caribbean, adjacent to the central harbour of the capital Oranjestad. They form a 309 ha site encompassing sand and boulder coral islets, on a substrate of submerged reef, which can vary in size and shape following winter storms and hurricanes. The area has been identified as an Important Bird Area by BirdLife International as a breeding site for Sandwich and common terns.
