= Luciano Javier Ávila =

Argentinian herpetologist

- Born: 26 March 1965 (age 61); Realicó, La Pampa Province, Argentina
- Education: Universidad Nacional de Río Cuarto (Lic.); Universidad Nacional de Tucumán (Ph.D.)
- Known for: Research on reptiles of southern South America, taxonomy and systematics of Patagonian lizards
- Scientific career
- Fields: Herpetology, Biology
- Workplaces: Consejo Nacional de Investigaciones Científicas y Técnicas (CONICET); Universidad Nacional de Río Cuarto

Luciano Javier Ávila (born 26 March 1965) is an Argentine herpetologist. His research focuses on reptiles of southern South America.

== Biography ==
Ávila obtained his Licenciado degree in biological sciences from the Universidad Nacional de Río Cuarto (UNRC) in March 1990. In April 1996, he earned his Ph.D. in biological sciences with a specialization in zoology from the Universidad Nacional de Tucumán (UNT). From 1997 to 1998, he worked as a domestic postdoctoral fellow at UNRC, and from 2000 to 2004 he held a postdoctoral fellowship abroad at the Department of Integrative Biology, Brigham Young University in Provo, Utah, United States.

Ávila served as a research assistant and fellow at the Secretariat of Science and Technology of UNRC, and as a fellow of the Consejo de Investigaciones Científicas y Técnicas de la Provincia de Córdoba (CONICOR). He also received training, internal, and external postdoctoral fellowships from the National Scientific and Technical Research Council (CONICET) of Argentina.

Since 1998, Ávila has been a scientific member of CONICET, and since 2010, an independent research associate. His scientific work has been published in more than 100 papers and notes in Argentine and international journals, including Herpetologica, Evolution, Systematic Biology, Cuadernos de Herpetología, Journal of Herpetology, Herpetological Review, Tropical Zoology, FACENA, Bulletin of the Maryland Herpetological Society, Biogeographica, Boletín de la Sociedad de Biología de Concepción, Revista Española de Herpetología, Herpetologische Zeitschrift, Acta Zoológica Lilloana, Zootaxa, Amphibia-Reptilia, Herpetozoa, Boletín del Museo Regional de Ciencias Naturales de Torín, Bulletin of the Chicago Herpetological Society, and Boletín de la Asociación Herpetológica Argentina. He has also published conference proceedings from scientific meetings in Argentina, Brazil, Uruguay, Chile, Venezuela, and the United States.

Ávila’s research interests include the taxonomy, systematics, phylogeny, evolution, ecology, conservation, biological inventories, and biogeography of South American reptiles, with a particular emphasis on Patagonian lizards. He has contributed to the description of more than 20 reptile species, including species in the genera Homonata, Liolaemus, Phymaturus and Teius.

His professional activities include basic research, postgraduate teaching, student advising and evaluation, curatorship of herpetological collections, management of scientific projects, evaluation of research proposals and scientific positions, biological baseline surveys for private oil and mining companies, and biodiversity assessments.

Ávila has been married to Mariana Morando since 1997. They have one son, born in 2003.
