= Jack W. Sites Jr =

Jack Walter Sites Jr.
- Born: August 6, 1951 (age 75); Clarksville, Tennessee, U.S.
- Education: Austin Peay State University; Texas A&M University
- Known for: Species descriptions in reptiles, evolutionary biology
- Scientific career
- Fields: Herpetology, Evolutionary biology
- Workplaces: Brigham Young University

Jack Walter Sites Jr. (born August 6, 1951) is an American herpetologist and evolutionary biologist.

== Biography ==
Sites worked in the summers of 1970 and 1971 as a seasonal naturalist for the Tennessee Department of Conservation. In August 1973, he married Joanne Lawson, with whom he has one daughter. That same year he received his Bachelor of Science from Austin Peay State University in Clarksville. From 1973 to 1975 he was a teaching assistant there, and in 1975 he graduated with a Master of Science. From 1975 to 1976 he worked as a vertebrate zoologist for the Tennessee Heritage Program of The Nature Conservancy. Beginning in 1976 he was a graduate research assistant in the Department of Wildlife & Fisheries Sciences at Texas A&M University in College Station, Texas, where in 1980 he completed his PhD with the dissertation Chromosomal, allozyme, and morphological variation in a selected portion of the Sceloporus grammicus complex.

From 1980 to 1982, during his postdoctoral phase, he was a visiting lecturer in the Department of Biology at Texas A&M University. From 1982 to 1986 he was a lecturer in the Department of Zoology, from 1986 to 1992 he was an associate professor, and since 1992 he has held the Maeser Professorship of Biology at Brigham Young University in Provo, Utah. Since 1982 he has also served as curator of amphibians and reptiles at the Monte L. Bean Life Science Museum of Brigham Young University.

Sites’ research interests and projects include herpetology, speciation and species delimitation, hybrid zone dynamics, the origins of parthenogenesis, phylogeography, systems biology, integrative taxonomy, conservation biology, and population genetics, as well as biodiversity studies and public outreach. His fieldwork has taken him to the southern Appalachians, the cypress swamps of the Everglades, the Chihuahuan Desert in Texas, canyon, desert, and mountain regions of the western United States, Hawaii, Alaska, Mexico, Venezuela, Ecuador and the Galápagos Islands, the Amazon basin, Australia, New Zealand, Panama, Costa Rica, Brazil, Namibia, South Africa, French Guiana, Argentina (Patagonia), Chile, and Peru.

He is a member of the National Center for Science Education (since 2000), the Chelonian Research Foundation (since 1996), the American Association for the Advancement of Science (since 1990), the American Society of Ichthyologists and Herpetologists (since 1975), and the Society for the Study of Amphibians and Reptiles (since 1975). From 1980 to 2009, he was a member of the Society for Conservation Biology.

Sites has contributed to the description of more than 30 species of lizards, including taxa in the genera Alexandresaurus, Bronchocela, Cnemaspis, Cyrtodactylus, Dryadosaura, Liolaemus and Vanzosaura. In 2017 he was also among the describers of the La Pera climbing rat (Ototylomys chiapensis).

== Eponymy ==
The Argentine herpetologist Luciano Javier Ávila and his colleagues named two Patagonian lizard species in his honor: Phymaturus sitesi (2011) and Liolaemus sitesi (2013), both members of the Iguania.
