= Afro-Arubans =

Minority ethnic group in Aruba

Afro-Arubanen (Dutch)

Languages
- Papiamento, Dutch, Spanish, English

Religion
- Christianity

Related ethnic groups
- Other Afro-Caribbeans, Afro-Curaçaoan, African people, Afro-Venezuelans Afro-Dutch

Afro-Arubans are Arubans of predominantly African ancestry. Afro-Arubans are a minority ethnic group in Aruba, representing 15% of Aruba's population. Many Afro-Arubans live in Aruba's second largest city, San Nicolaas, located on the southern tip of the island.

While Aruba had enslaved Africans, they were in smaller numbers as the island had very few slave-based plantations due to its poor soil and arid climate. Most Afro-Arubans today descend from nearby Caribbean islands and nations such as Sint Maarten, Dominican Republic, Suriname, Guyana, Haiti, Jamaica, Trinidad and Tobago, Grenada, Curaçao, Saba, Sint Eustatius, the Lesser Antilles and South America.

== History ==
Afro-Arubans arrived in Aruba in three waves.

During the colonial era, enslaved Africans were transported to Aruba by Dutch settlers, although not in large numbers as the Dutch (and before them, the Spanish) considered Aruba too dry for large-scale plantations. Papiamento, the now common language of the ABC islands, dates back at least 300 years and is predominantly based on Afro-Portuguese linguistic structures combined with vocabulary and influences from Spanish, West African languages, Dutch, English and Amerindian languages. Papiamento arrived in Aruba from Curaçao. Prior to the 20th century, most black Arubans likely arrived free or enslaved from Curaçao or from Africa via Curaçao, or descended from earlier migrants from Curaçao, which was historically one of the largest Dutch slave trading ports in the Caribbean.

Small scale migration from Curaçao, and from other Caribbean islands, to Aruba continued after emancipation. Slaves did not form a separate Afro Caribbean culture and after emancipation in 1863, former slaves integrated in the free society rapidly (Alofs 2003a.

Throughout the 20th century, many immigrants from the British West-Indies (namely from Trinidad and Grenada), Sint Maarten, Saba, Sint Eustatius, and other islands settled in San Nicolaas, namely to work in the Aruban oil industry. Many brought their local English Creoles and dialects to the town, later developing into what is today known as San Nicolaas English (also known locally as Bush English, Sani English, We English, Village Talk etc.).

In the 21st century, most recent African-descended immigrants to Aruba come from a new inflow of Haitian, Surinamese, Curaçaoan and Dominican labor migrants.

== Notable people ==
- Eric Abdul
- Xander Bogaerts, baseball player
- Gregor Breinburg
- Niesha Butler
- Virginia Dementricia, rebel slave
- Denzel Dumfries, football player
- Boy Ecury, resistance fighter
- Euson, singer
- Lolita Euson, writer and poet
- Bobby Farrell, dancer and singer
- Ronald Gomez
- Javier Jimenez
- Joshua John, football player
- Jim Jones (rapper)
- Gene Kingsale, baseball player
- Matthew Lentink
- Nickenson Paul
- Jonathan Ruiz
- Jurriën Timber
- Quinten Timber
