= San Nicolás =

San Nicolás is the Spanish name for Saint Nicholas, and may refer to:

== People ==
- Michael F.Q. San Nicolas, a Guamanian politician
- Moisés San Nicolás, an Andorran footballer

== Places ==
=== Argentina ===
- San Nicolás de los Arroyos, in the province of Buenos Aires
  - San Nicolás Agreement, signed there
- San Nicolás, Buenos Aires, a neighborhood in the city of Buenos Aires
- San Nicolás, La Rioja
- San Nicolás Partido (province of Buenos Aires)

=== Aruba ===
- San Nicolaas
  - San Nicolas Bay Reef Islands

=== Chile ===
- San Nicolás, Chile, a village and commune in Punilla Province, Ñuble Region

=== Costa Rica ===
- San Nicolás District, Cartago; see districts of Costa Rica

=== Cuba ===
- San Nicolás de Bari, province of Mayabeque

=== Honduras ===
- San Nicolás, Copán
- San Nicolás, Santa Bárbara

=== Mexico ===
- San Nicolás de Carretas (Chihuahua))
- San Nicolás de los Garza (Nuevo León)
- San Nicolás de Los Ranchos (Puebla)
- San Nicolás Buenos Aires (Puebla)
- San Nicolás Hidalgo (Oaxaca)
- San Nicolás Tolentino (San Luis Potosí)
- San Nicolás, Baja California
- San Nicolás, Guerrero
- San Nicolás, Jalisco
- San Nicolás, Oaxaca
- San Nicolás, Puebla
- San Nicolás, Tamaulipas

=== Nicaragua ===
- San Nicolás, Estelí

=== Philippines ===
- San Nicolas, Batangas
- San Nicolas, Ilocos Norte
- San Nicolas, Manila
- San Nicolas, Pangasinan
- San Nicolas, Canaman, Camarines Sur

=== Peru ===
- San Nicolás District, Rodríguez de Mendoza (Amazonas)
- San Nicolás District, Carlos Fermín Fitzcarrald (Ancash)

=== Spain ===
- La Aldea de San Nicolás, Canaries
- St Nicholas' Church, Madrid
- Pamplona, Navarre
  - St Nicholas' Church, Pamplona, a medieval church
  - San Nicolás (Pamplona borough), a medieval borough
- San Nicolás del Puerto (Andalusia)

=== United States ===
- San Nicolas Island, one of California's Channel Islands

== Ships ==
- HMS San Nicolas, Royal Navy ship, formerly Spanish navy ship San Nicolás, captured at the Battle of Cape St Vincent in 1797
- SS San Nicolas, Panamanian cargo ship in service 1949–64, formerly German ship SS Claus Rickmers
- SS San Nicolas, a Lake tanker sunk by the German Submarine U-502 on 16-Feb-1942

== See also ==
- Church of San Nicolás (disambiguation)
- Nicholas of Tolentino, for the Italian saint known as San Nicolas de Tolentino
- Nicholas of Tolentino (disambiguation)
