= List of lighthouses in Aruba =

This is a list of lighthouses in Aruba.

== Lighthouses ==
Name	Image	Year built	Location & coordinates	Class of Light	Tower height	NGA number	Admiralty number	Range nml
California Lighthouse		1916	Noord; 12°36′49.5″N 70°03′05.1″W	electronic	30 metres (98 ft)	15850	J6330	19
Fort Zoutman Lighthouse		1796	Oranjestad; 12°31′04.0″N 70°02′08.6″W	inactive	5-storey	ARLHS; ARU-004	--	--
Seroe Colorado Lighthouse		1881 est.	San Nicolaas; 12°25′06.4″N 69°52′09.0″W	Fl W 6s.	8 metres (26 ft)	15960	J6368	21

== See also ==
- Lists of lighthouses and lightvessels
