= Seroe Colorado Lighthouse =

Coordinates: 12°25′06″N 69°52′09″W

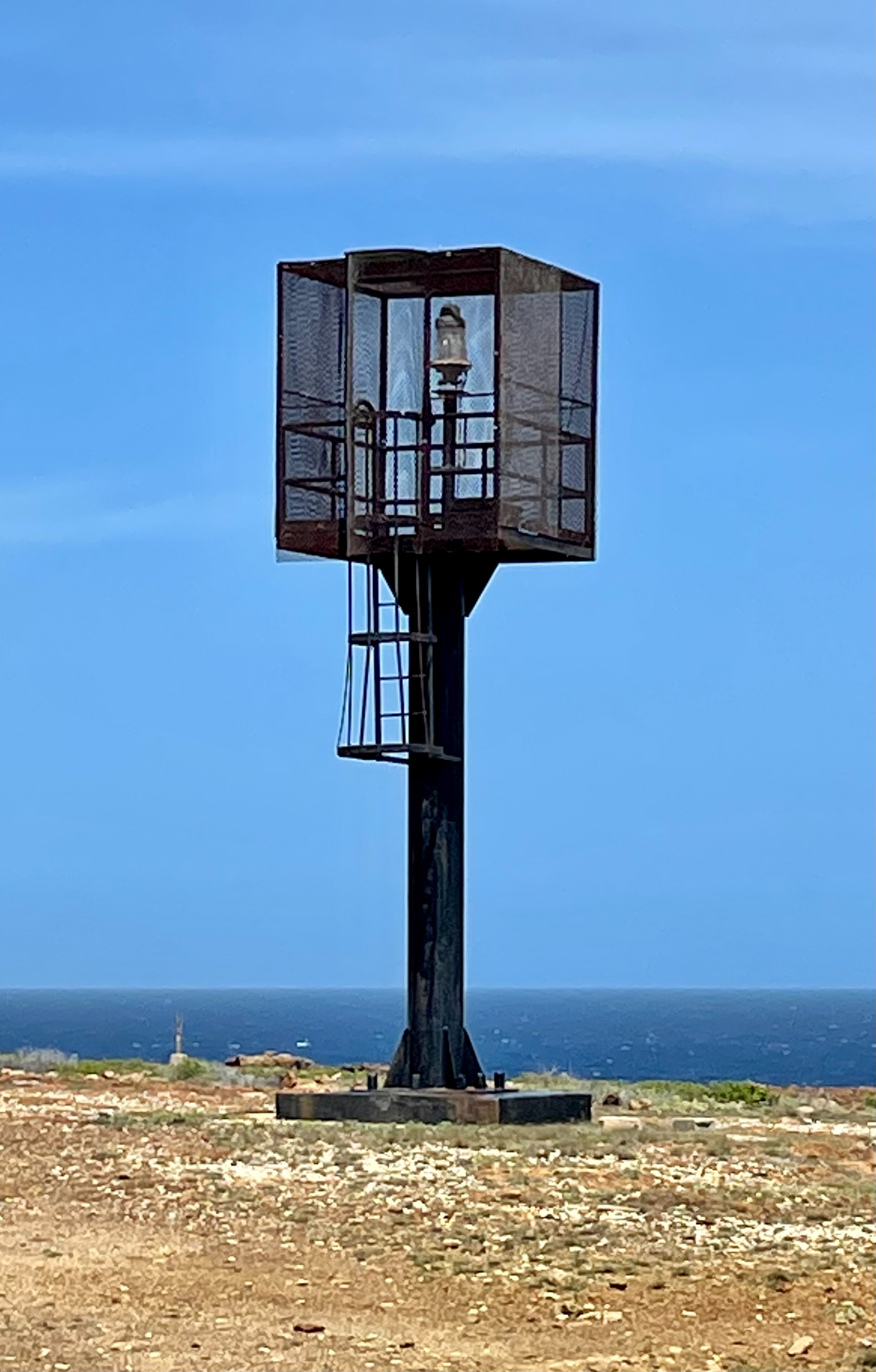
- Current lighthouse at Seroe Colorado
- Location: Aruba

Tower
- Constructed: 1880
- Construction: wood (1880); stone (1925); Iron (present)
- Automated: 1925
- Shape: Pyramide (1880); Rectangular cuboid (1925); Cube on column (present)

Light
- Characteristic: Fl W 6s

The Seroe Colorado Lighthouse, known also by the Colorado Point Lighthouse, is located in Seroe Colorado. It stands as one of two currently active lighthouses on the island.

== Geography ==
Seroe Colorado is the farthest southeastern point of the island and forms an approximately 38 metres (125 ft) high rounded plateau with an area of about 22 hectares (54 acres). On the eastern and southeastern sides of this steep cliff, it descends vertically towards the sea. On these steep rock walls, there is a tremendous surf, and from a distance, you can already see the white foam splashing high above the rocks, especially during strong trade winds.

== History ==
Aruba Phosphate Company at Seroe Colorado had a poorly equipped lighthouse in 1880. The tower had a square cross-section but tapered from the bottom to top. This lighthouse had a petroleum lantern mounted on a wooden structure, and the coastal lighting was inadequate. It was meant to serve as a beacon for passing ships but often emitted smoke, making it invisible even at a relatively short distance from the island.

The original wooden tower was replaced with a stone tower and electric lighting in 1925. However, much of the original construction no longer remains.

The current lighthouse features: a light displayed at the top of an 8-metre-high (26 ft) tower, shielded by a wire cage. With a focal height of 51 metres (167 ft) above sea level, the light can be seen for 21 nautical miles (39 km; 24 mi).

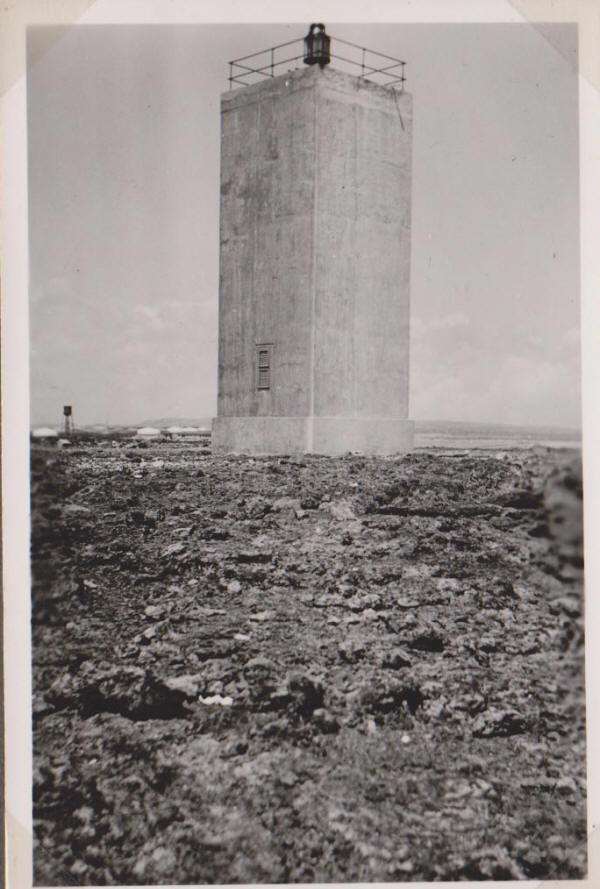
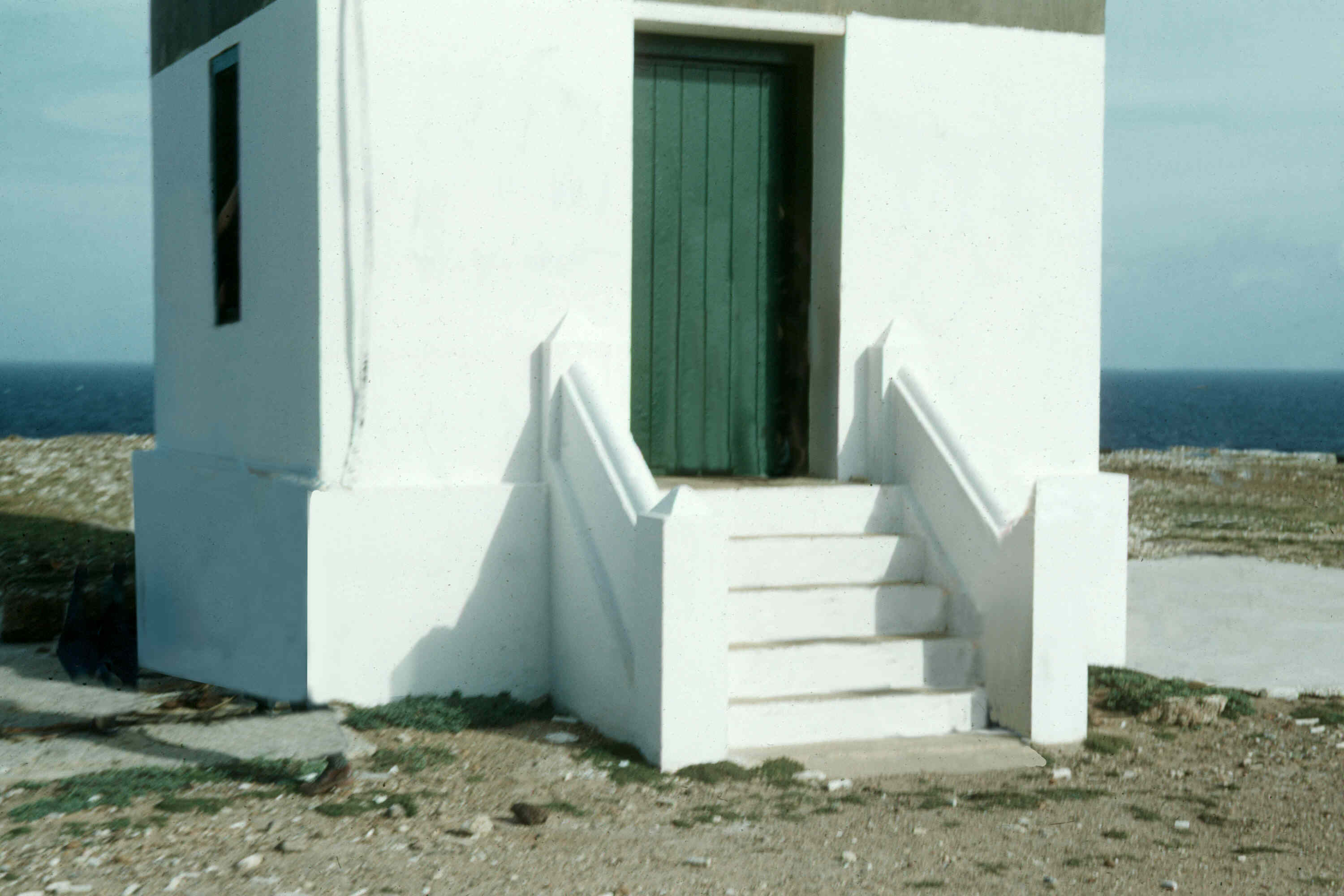
left: Automated stone lighthouse (c. 1938–1940) right: Lighthouse front view: green door with staircase, bottom third section of tower is painted in white and the top two thirds is exposed concrete (c. 1950s)

== See also ==
- List of lighthouses in Aruba

== Sources ==
- Berkhout, J. (1997). "De Vuurtoren van Westpunt Aruba" [Westpunt Aruba Lighthouse]. Arubaans Akkoord : Opstellen over Aruba van voor de komst van de olieindustrie [Aruba Accord: Writings about Aruba from before the arrival of the oil industry] (in Dutch). Stichting Libri Antilliani: Stichting Libri Antilliani.
- Lampe, H.E. (1932). Aruba Voorheen en Thans [Aruba Then and Now].
- Nooyen, R.H. (1969). Aruba Nostra (in Dutch). Aruba – via Archive.org.
