= Sunrise Solar Park =

Photovoltaic power plant in San Nicolaas, Aruba

- Country: Aruba
- Location: San Nicolaas, Aruba
- Coordinates: 12°25′56.4″N 69°53′23.6″W
- Status: Operational
- Commission date: 2018

Power generation
- Nameplate capacity: 7.5 MW

The Sunrise Solar Park is a photovoltaic power station in San Nicolaas, Aruba.

== History ==
The groundbreaking ceremony for the power station construction was attended by Prime Minister Mike Eman and other government officials. The power station was commissioned in 2018. It had an estimated budget of €9,894,235.

== Technical specifications ==
The power station has an installed capacity of 7.5 MW.

== See also ==
- Economy of Aruba
