= Demographics of Aruba =

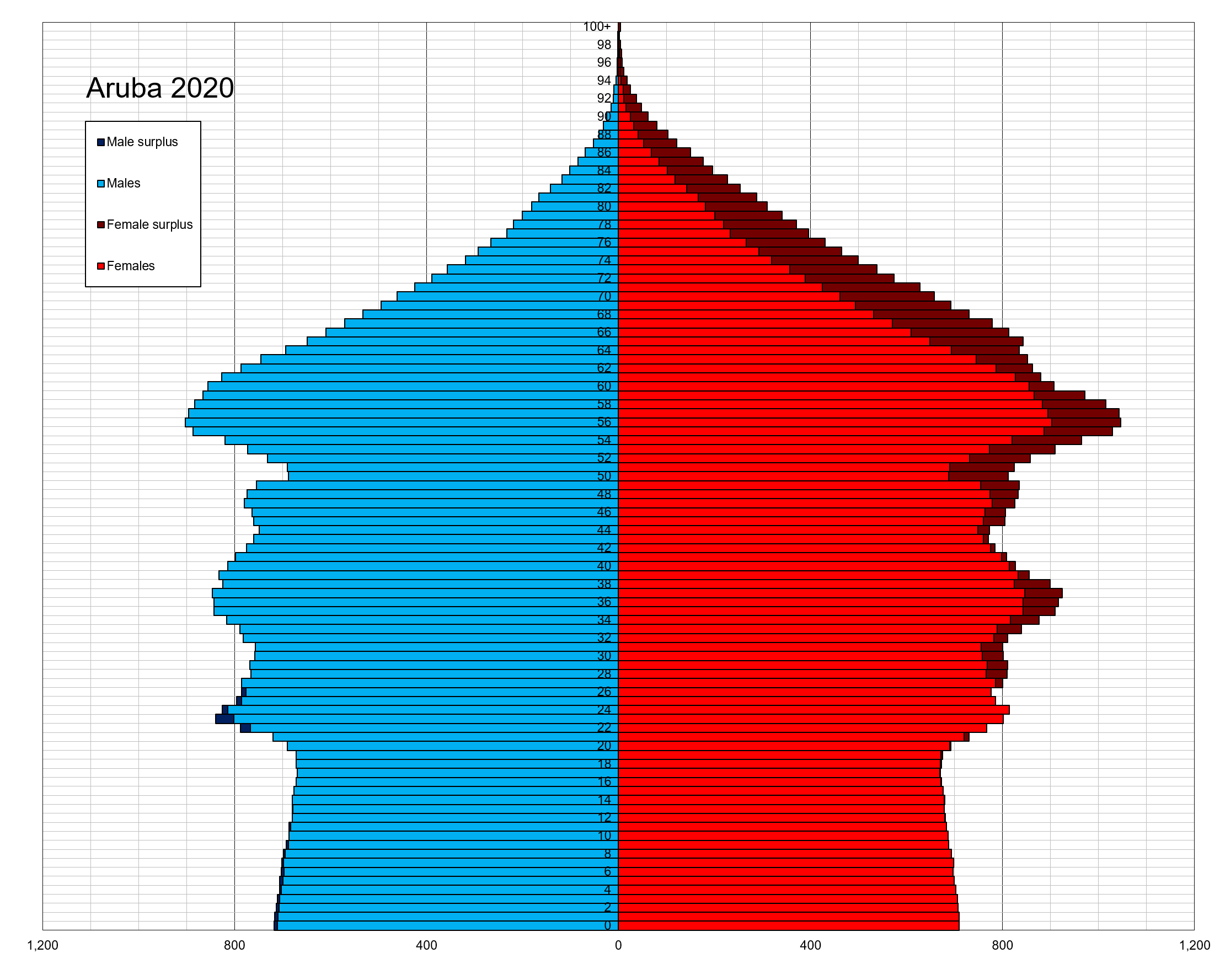
Aruba population pyramid in 2020

This is a demography of the population of Aruba, including population density, ethnicity, nationality language use, education level, age, health of the populace, economic status, religious affiliations and other aspects of the population.

Census population and average annual growth rate
Year	Pop.	±% p.a.
1930	15,659	—
1960	53,199	+4.16%
1972	57,908	+0.71%
1981	60,312	+0.45%
1991	66,687	+1.01%
2000	90,506	+3.45%
2010	101,484	+1.15%

Having poor soil and aridity, Aruba was largely detached from plantation economics and the slave trade. In 1515, the Spanish transported the entire population to Hispaniola to work in the copper mines; most were allowed to return when the mines were tapped out. The Dutch, who took control a century later, left the Arawaks to graze livestock, using the island as a source of meat for other Dutch possessions in the Caribbean. Arawak heritage is stronger on Aruba than on most Caribbean islands.

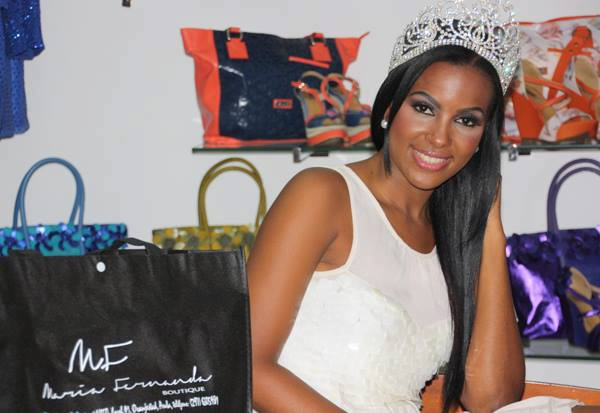
Stefanie Evangelista, the 2013 Miss Aruba

The population is estimated to be 75% mixed European/Amerindian/African, 15% Black and 10% other ethnicities. Although no full-blooded Aboriginals remain, the features of many islanders clearly indicate their genetic Arawak heritage. The population is primarily descended from the Caquetío Indians, Dutch and Spanish settlers, and enslaved Africans, and to a lesser extent from later migrants from South America, the Caribbean, Europe and Asia.

Aruba's population is very ethnically diverse, multiracial, international and multicultural, descending from a mix of various people groups and being home to over 140+ nationalities. The population of the island has grown significantly in the last 50 years, primarily due to immigration, with an estimated 38.7% of the population being foreign-born as of 2024. In recent decades, there has been substantial immigration to the island from neighboring South-American and Caribbean nations, possibly attracted by higher paying jobs, namely in the tourism industry. In 2007, new immigration laws were introduced and passed to help control the growth of the population by restricting foreign workers to a maximum of three years residency on the island.

There is a significant Latin-American population and presence on the island. Many of Aruba's families are partially or fully descended from Venezuelan immigrants. Due to Aruba's close proximity to Colombia, many Colombians and their descendants live in Aruba as well. Communities of Dominicans, Ecuadorians and Peruvians can also be found on the island. A sizable minority of the population is descended from various Caribbean nations and territories, mainly from the former British West-Indies. There has also been recent immigration from Europe and North-America to the island, namely from the Netherlands and to a lesser extent the United States. Many Asians and their descendants live in Aruba as well, most notably those of Chinese, Filipino, Indian and Javanese descent. Chinese Arubans are approximately 1% of the population.

Most people on Aruba are multilingual, being able to speak three to four (or more) languages. The two official languages of Aruba are Dutch and the pre-dominant, national language Papiamento. Papiamento is a Portuguese-based creole, formed primarily from 16th century Portuguese with influences from Spanish, Dutch, and several other languages. Spanish and English are also widely known and spoken due to proximity to Latin-America and North-American tourism. There are also smaller communities of speakers of other languages on the island, such as Portuguese, French and Chinese. Children in Aruba are known to start school by the age of four and are commonly known to be multilingual by this time. Although the official languages of Aruba are Papiamento and Dutch, English and Spanish is taught through education when reaching the sixth grade. French is also taught as an optional subject in higher levels of education.

Roman Catholicism is the dominant religion, practiced by around 75% of the population. Various Protestant denominations are also present on the island. Various other religions and denominations are also practiced on the island by small communities.

== Population ==
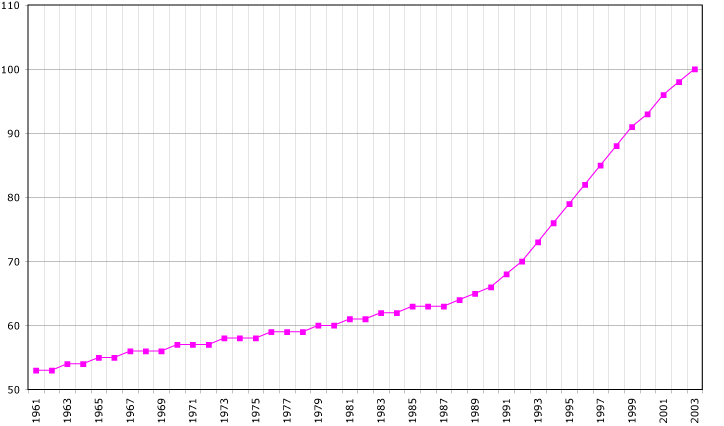
Population of Aruba in thousands, 1961–2003

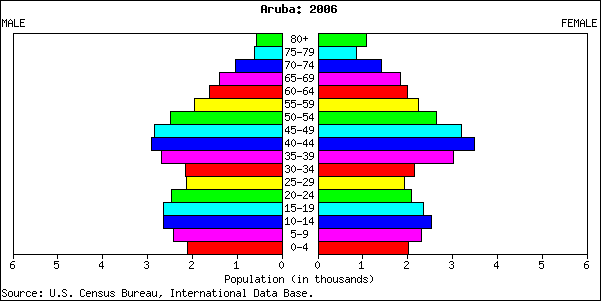
Population pyramid of Aruba

The estimated population as of 2021 is 106,537, per the 2022 revision of the World Population Prospects. Most of the population is of mixed ancestry, including Europeans, Caquetío Indians and Africans (in some cases, Asians also). Between 1985 and 1987, the population declined due to emigration, but in 1990 this trend was reversed due to the development of the oil and tourism industries.

=== Structure of the population ===
Population Estimates by Sex and Age Group (01.VII.2013):

Age group	Male	Female	Total	%
Total	50 117	55 859	105 976	100
0–4	3 061	3 016	6 077	5.73
5–9	3 619	3 387	7 006	6.61
10–14	3 733	3 711	7 445	7.03
15–19	3 872	3 744	7 616	7.19
20–24	3 145	2 941	6 086	5.74
25–29	2 775	2 994	5 769	5.44
30–34	3 011	3 578	6 589	6.22
35–39	3 249	3 860	7 109	6.71
40–44	3 906	4 551	8 456	7.98
45–49	4 072	4 798	8 871	8.37
50–54	4 275	4 873	9 148	8.63
55–59	3 526	4 176	7 702	7.27
60–64	2 805	3 228	6 033	5.69
65–69	1 942	2 456	4 397	4.15
70–74	1 413	1 735	3 148	2.97
75–79	886	1 368	2 254	2.13
80–84	554	842	1 396	1.32
85–89	195	370	566	0.53
90–94	65	160	225	0.21
95–99	10	55	66	0.06
100+	4	16	20	0.02
Age group	Male	Female	Total	Percent
0–14	10 413	10 114	20 527	19.37
15–64	34 635	38 743	73 378	69.24
65+	5 069	7 002	12 071	11.39

Population Estimates by Sex and Age Group (01.VII.2021):

Age group	Male	Female	Total	%
Total	50 795	56 900	107 695	100
0–4	2 652	2 455	5 107	4.74
5–9	3 174	3 045	6 219	5.77
10–14	3 415	3 379	6 793	6.31
15–19	3 551	3 301	6 852	6.36
20–24	2 786	2 592	5 377	4.99
25–29	2 945	3 048	5 994	5.57
30–34	3 177	3 456	6 633	6.16
35–39	3 206	3 716	6 922	6.43
40–44	3 284	3 993	7 277	6.76
45–49	3 400	4 059	7 459	6.93
50–54	3 800	4 596	8 396	7.80
55–59	4 018	4 720	8 738	8.11
60–64	3 683	4 464	8 147	7.56
65–69	2 954	3 576	6 530	6.06
70–74	2 112	2 573	4 685	4.35
75–79	1 322	1 781	3 102	2.88
80–84	817	1 169	1 986	1.84
85–89	347	677	1 024	0.95
90–94	122	229	351	0.33
95+	30	72	102	0.09
Age group	Male	Female	Total	Percent
0–14	9 241	8 879	18 120	16.83
15–64	33 850	37 944	71 794	66.66
65+	7 704	10 077	17 781	16.51

== Vital statistics ==
	Average population (x 1000)	Live births	Deaths	Natural change	Crude birth rate (per 1000)	Crude death rate (per 1000)	Natural change (per 1000)	TFR
1952	38	1,958	249	1,709	50.2	6.4	43.9	
1953	40	2,002	172	1,830	49.9	4.3	45.6	
1954	42	2,015	205	1,810	48.2	4.9	43.3	
1955	44	1,916	236	1,680	43.8	5.4	38.4	
1956	46	1,918	228	1,690	41.8	5.0	36.8	
1957	48	2,017	233	1,784	41.8	4.8	37.0	
1958	51	1,968	232	1,736	39.0	4.6	34.4	
1959	53	1,836	248	1,588	34.9	4.7	30.2	
1960	54	1,916	254	1,662	35.3	4.7	30.7	
1961	55	1,838	217	1,621	33.2	3.9	29.2	
1962	56	1,787	215	1,572	31.8	3.8	28.0	
1963	57	1,657	208	1,449	29.2	3.7	25.6	
1964	57	1,556	224	1,332	27.3	3.9	23.4	
1965	57	1,420	225	1,195	24.8	3.9	20.8	
1966	58	1,230	219	1,011	21.3	3.8	17.5	
1967	58	1,151	226	925	19.8	3.9	15.9	
1968	58	1,143	258	885	19.6	4.4	15.2	
1969	58	1,188	318	870	20.5	5.5	15.0	
1970	58	1,234	289	945	21.3	5.0	16.3	
1971	58	1,232	292	940	21.2	5.0	16.2	
1972	58.047	1,201	275	926	20.1	4.6	15.5	
1973	58.299	1,003	287	716	17.2	4.9	12.3	
1974	58.349	962	298	664	16.5	5.1	11.4	
1975	58.295	968	286	682	16.6	4.9	11.7	
1976	58.368	941	300	641	16.1	5.1	11.0	
1977	58.580	993	320	673	17.0	5.5	11.5	
1978	58.776	1 058	284	774	18.0	4.8	13.2	
1979	59.191	1 065	318	747	18.0	5.4	12.6	
1980	59.909	1 125	288	837	18.8	4.8	14.0	
1981	60.563	1 051	317	734	17.4	5.2	12.1	
1982	61.276	1 036	313	723	16.9	5.1	11.8	
1983	62.228	1 133	339	794	18.2	5.4	12.8	
1984	62.901	1 169	323	846	18.6	5.1	13.4	
1985	61.728	1 109	334	775	18.0	5.4	12.6	
1986	59.931	1 014	377	637	16.9	6.3	10.6	
1987	59.159	992	370	622	16.8	6.3	10.5	
1988	59.331	949	335	614	16.0	5.6	10.3	
1989	60.443	1,141	372	769	18.9	6.2	12.7	
1990	62.753	1,140	419	721	18.2	6.7	11.5	
1991	65.896	1,157	429	728	17.6	6.5	11.0	
1992	69.005	1,292	424	868	18.7	6.1	12.6	2.214
1993	73.685	1,337	402	935	18.1	5.5	12.7	2.052
1994	77.595	1,315	431	884	16.9	5.6	11.4	2.036
1995	79.805	1,419	504	915	17.8	6.3	11.5	2.137
1996	83.021	1,452	469	983	17.5	5.6	11.8	2.088
1997	86.301	1,457	497	960	16.9	5.8	11.1	2.038
1998	88.451	1,315	505	810	14.9	5.7	9.2	1.821
1999	89.659	1,251	561	690	14.0	6.3	7.7	1.716
2000	90.588	1,294	531	763	14.3	5.9	8.4	1.896
2001	91.439	1,263	435	828	13.8	4.8	9.1	1.866
2002	92.074	1,228	492	736	13.3	5.3	8.0	1.874
2003	93.128	1,244	501	743	13.4	5.4	8.0	1.883
2004	95.138	1,193	502	691	12.5	5.3	7.3	1.787
2005	97.635	1,263	482	781	12.9	4.9	8.0	1.834
2006	99.405	1,359	539	820	13.7	5.4	8.2	2.035
2007	100.150	1,339	533	806	13.4	5.3	8.0	2.041
2008	100.917	1,319	554	765	13.1	5.5	7.6	2.024
2009	101.604	1,254	629	625	12.3	6.2	6.1	1.961
2010	101.838	1,216	619	597	11.9	6.1	5.9	1.923
2011	102.591	1,249	642	607	12.2	6.3	5.9	1.938
2012	104.110	1,311	609	702	12.6	5.9	6.8	2.019
2013	105.675	1,326	573	753	12.6	5.4	7.1	2.010
2014	106.807	1,374	653	721	12.9	6.1	6.8	2.081
2015	107.906	1,247	687	560	11.6	6.4	5.2	1.859
2016	108.727	1,264	789	475	11.6	7.3	4.4	1.899
2017	108.735	1,248	717	531	11.5	6.6	4.9	1.894
2018	108.908	1,177	730	447	10.8	6.7	4.1	1.779
2019	109.203	1,184	671	513	10.8	6.1	4.7	1.816
2020	108.587	1 052	743	309	9.7	6.8	2.9	1.638
2021	107.700	1 019	964	55	9.5	9.0	0.5	1.619
2022	107.310	915	879	36	8.5	8.2	0.3	1.463
2023	107.359	856	814	42	8.0	7.6	0.4	1.382
2024	108.016	860	840	20	8.0	7.8	0.2	1.387
2025	109.545	824	833	-9	7.5	7.6	-0.1	1.287

== Ethnic groups ==
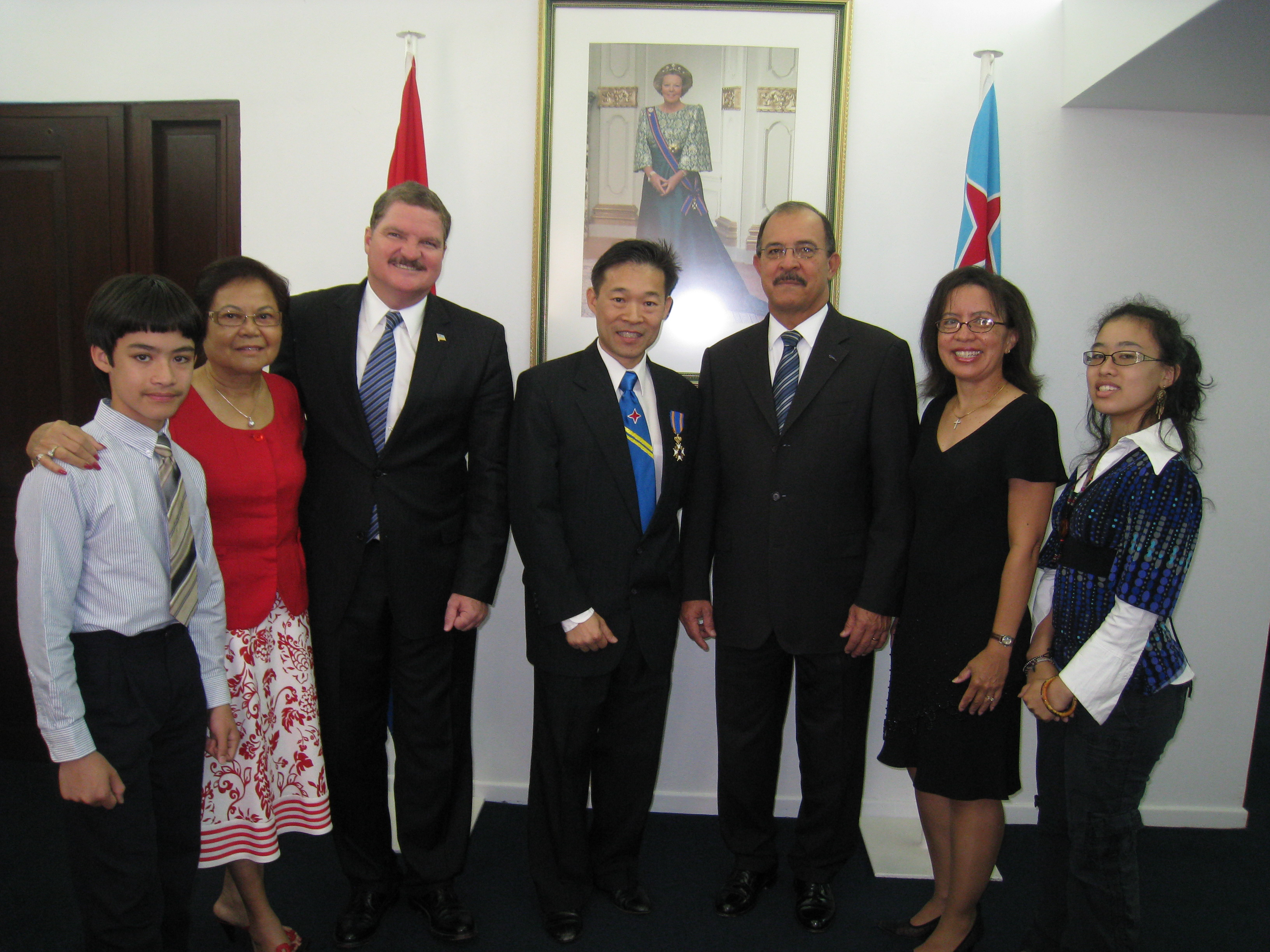
Group of Arubans, including Prime Minister Mike Eman, Governor Fredis Refunjol, and Edward Cheung and his family who are Arubans of Chinese descent.

Ethnic groups of Aruba
1. Aruban (66.0%)
2. Other (16.5%)
3. Colombian (9.10%)
4. Dutch (4.30%)
5. Dominican (4.10%)

The population is estimated to be 75% mixed European/Amerindian/African, 15% Black and 10% other ethnicities.

In 2019, recently arrived Venezuelan refugees were estimated to number around 17,000, accounting for some 15% of the island's population.

== Languages ==
Languages of Aruba
Languages	percent
Papiamento	69.4%
Spanish	13.7%
English	7.1%
Dutch	6.1%
Chinese	1.5%
Other	1.7%
Unspecified	0.4%

== Religions ==
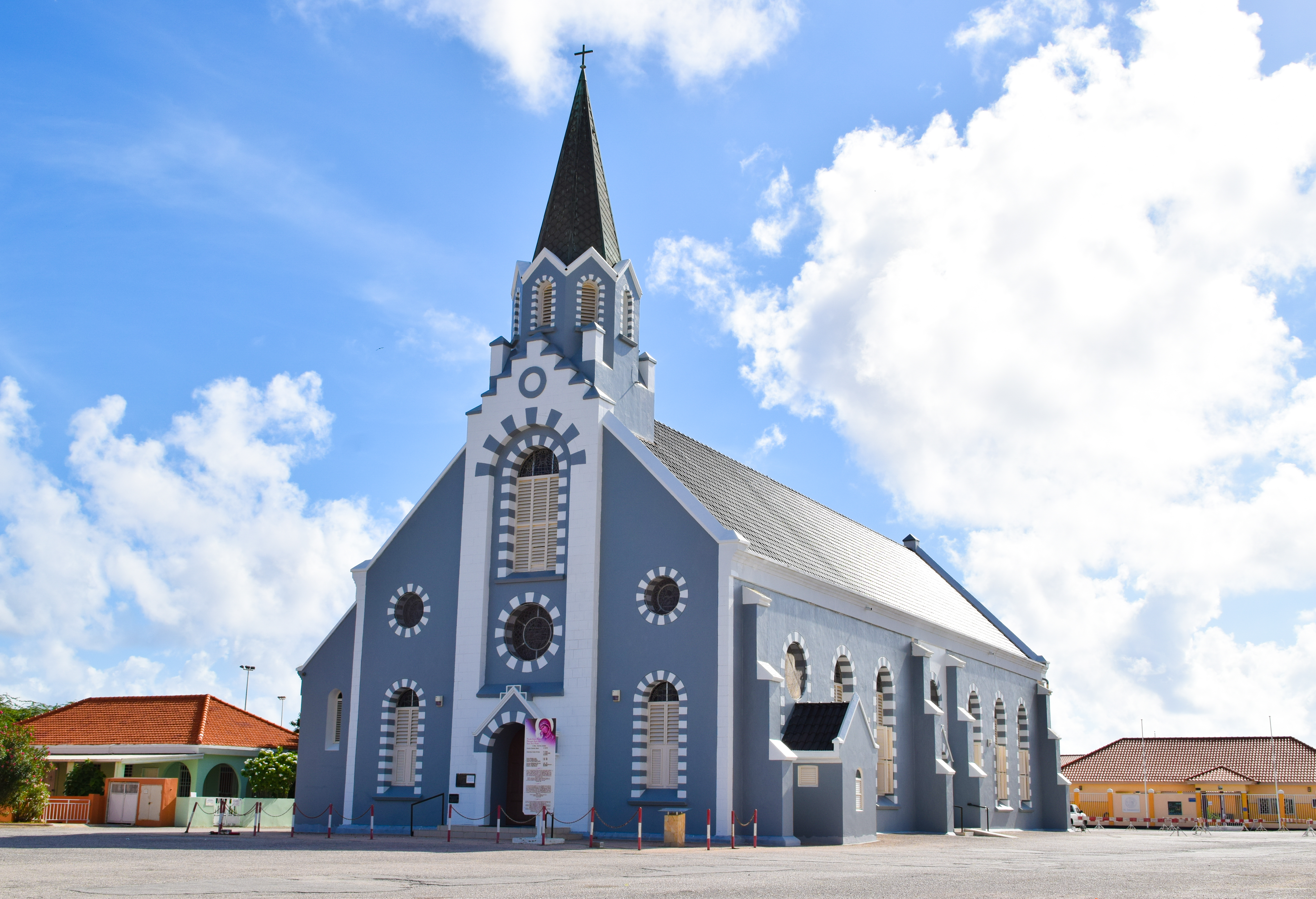
St Ann's Church, Aruba, a Catholic church.

Religions of Aruba
Religions	percent
Roman Catholic	75.3%
Other	12%
None	5.5%
Protestant	4.9%
Other Christian	3.4%
Jehovah's Witness	1.7%
Unspecified	0.5%
