= Seroe Colorado =

Seroe Colorado Ceru Colorado
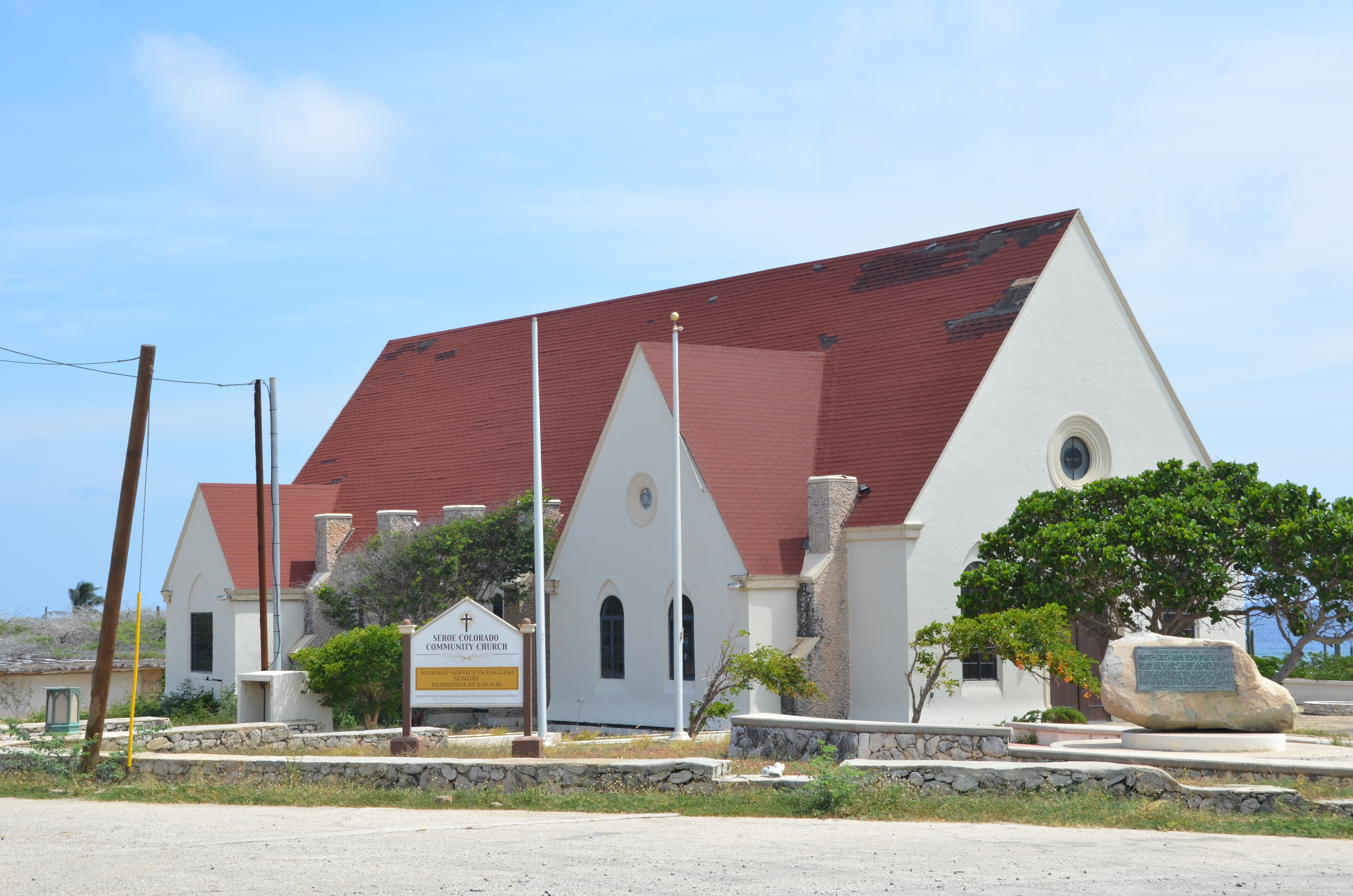
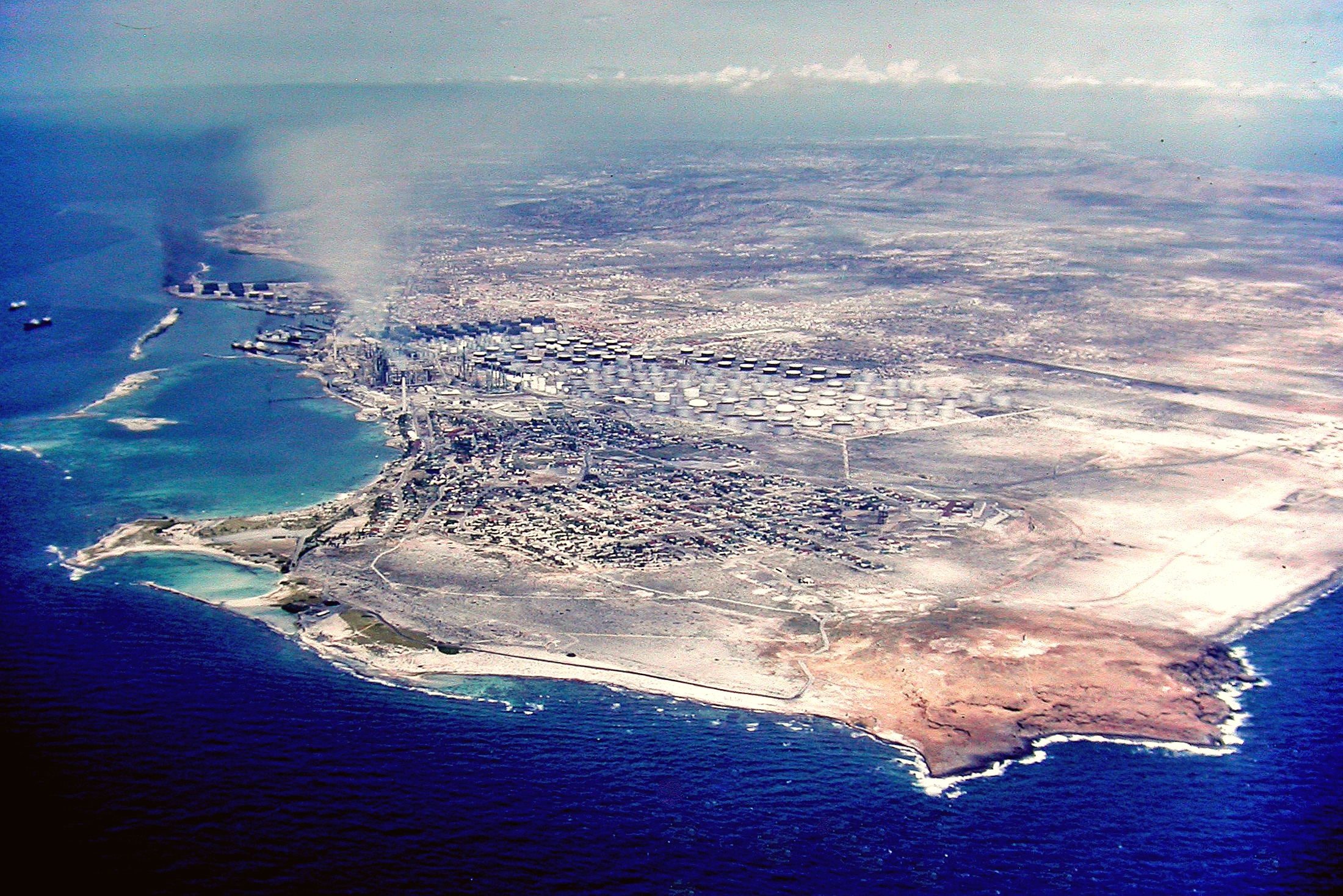
- Community church Aerial view of Seroe Colorado
- Interactive map of Seroe Colorado
- Coordinates: 12°25′N 69°52′W
- State: Kingdom of the Netherlands
- Country: Aruba
- Region: San Nicolas Zuid

Area
  - Total: 4,458 km^{2} (1,721 sq mi)

Population (2020)
  - Total: 258
  - Density: 57.87/km^{2} (149.9/sq mi)

Seroe Colorado (also referred to as Ceru Colorado and Colorado Point) is a village situated at the southeastern tip of Aruba, an island located in the Dutch Caribbean. Nowadays, it is known for the anchor in memory to all seamen. Historically, between 1878 and 1914, Seroe Colorado served as the location for the Colorado Guano Mine, which was involved in the extraction of guano. Additionally, the Seroe Colorado Lighthouse can be found in this village, serving as a prominent landmark.

== History ==
=== Mining ===
In 1873 or 1874, Henri Waters Gravenhorst discovered guano on Seroe Colorado, which led to subsequent developments in the area. In 1879, Aruba Island Gold Mining Company, along with Charles Brodie Sewell from London, established the Aruba Phosphate Company to initiate mining operations in the region. Initially, open quarry mines were utilized, but later on, shaft mines were also employed. To facilitate transportation, a pier was constructed in the harbour of San Nicolaas, and a narrow-gauge railway line spanning six kilometres was built to connect Seroe Colorado with San Nicolaas.

During World War II, Colorado Point was fortified with guns to safeguard the nearby oil refinery located at Lago Colony. However, in the 21st century, the village and its surrounding area have gradually become deserted and peaceful, lacking the activity and bustle it once possessed.

=== Education ===
In September 1929, a significant milestone was achieved in Seroe Colorado with the International School of Aruba, marking the first English school in Aruba. Lago Oil and Transport Co. Ltd. owned and operated the school, primarily catering to the educational needs of expatriates' children residing on the island. However, during the 1960s, the school expanded its services and began admitting the dependents of local residents, charging tuition fees for enrollment.

Following the closure of Lago in 1985, a group of parents whose children were still attending the school came together to form the International School of Aruba (ISA). This non-profit foundation was established with the aim of ensuring the continuation of English language education on the island. The ISA took on the responsibility of providing high-quality education to students, preserving the legacy of the original English school in Seroe Colorado, and meeting the educational needs of the diverse community on the island of Aruba.

== Anchor monument ==
On March 31, 1985, a significant event took place in Seroe Colorado, which coincided with the closure of the Lago Oil Refinery. An anchor, painted red and standing nearly 5 metres (16 ft) tall, was installed on the beach. Originating from Germany in the 1960s, the anchor had been lost at sea before finding its final resting place in Seroe Colorado. It holds a dedication to all the seamen who lost their lives at sea.

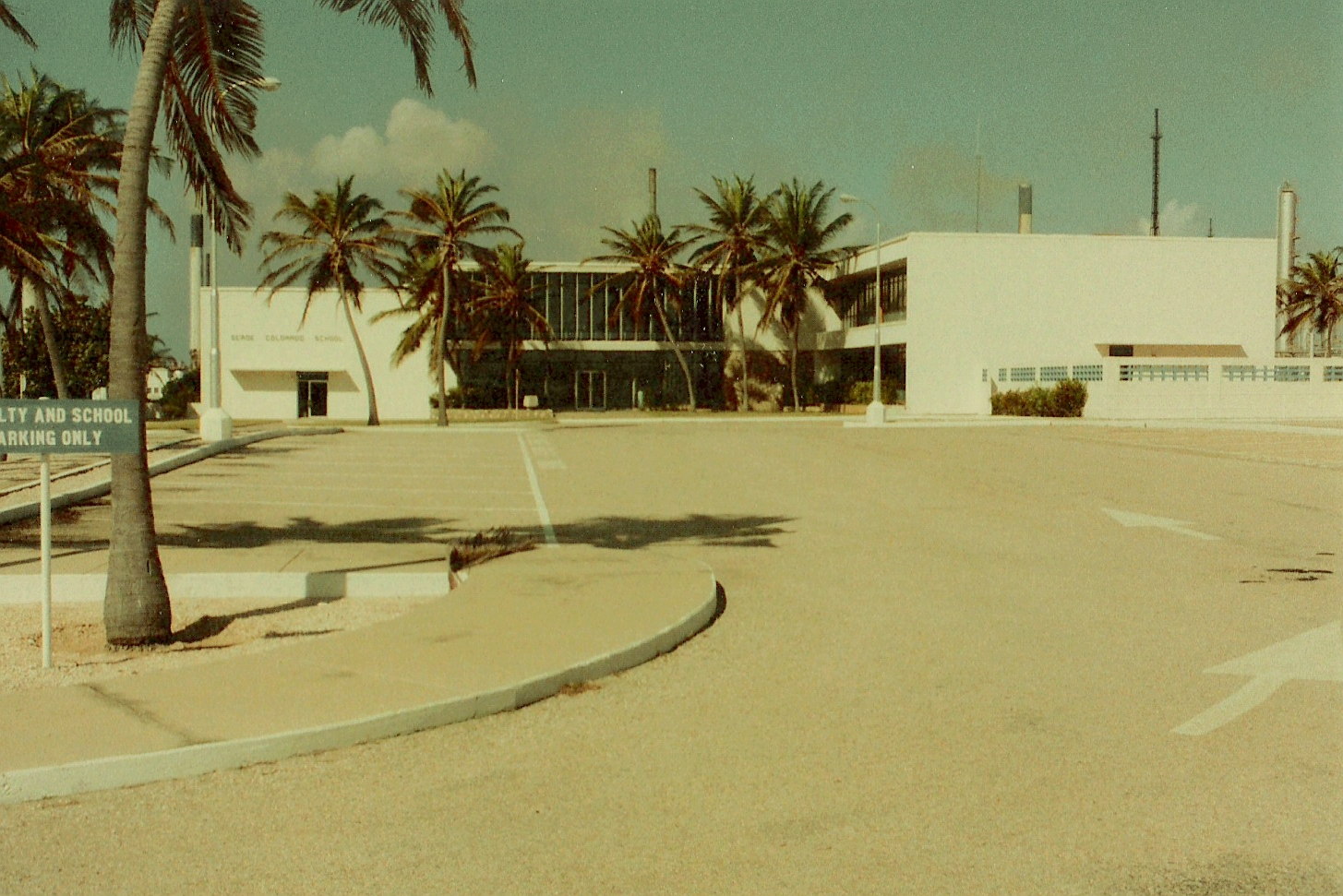
Seroe Colorado School, the right wing is the Lago Medical Clinic (Lago Colony, 1985)

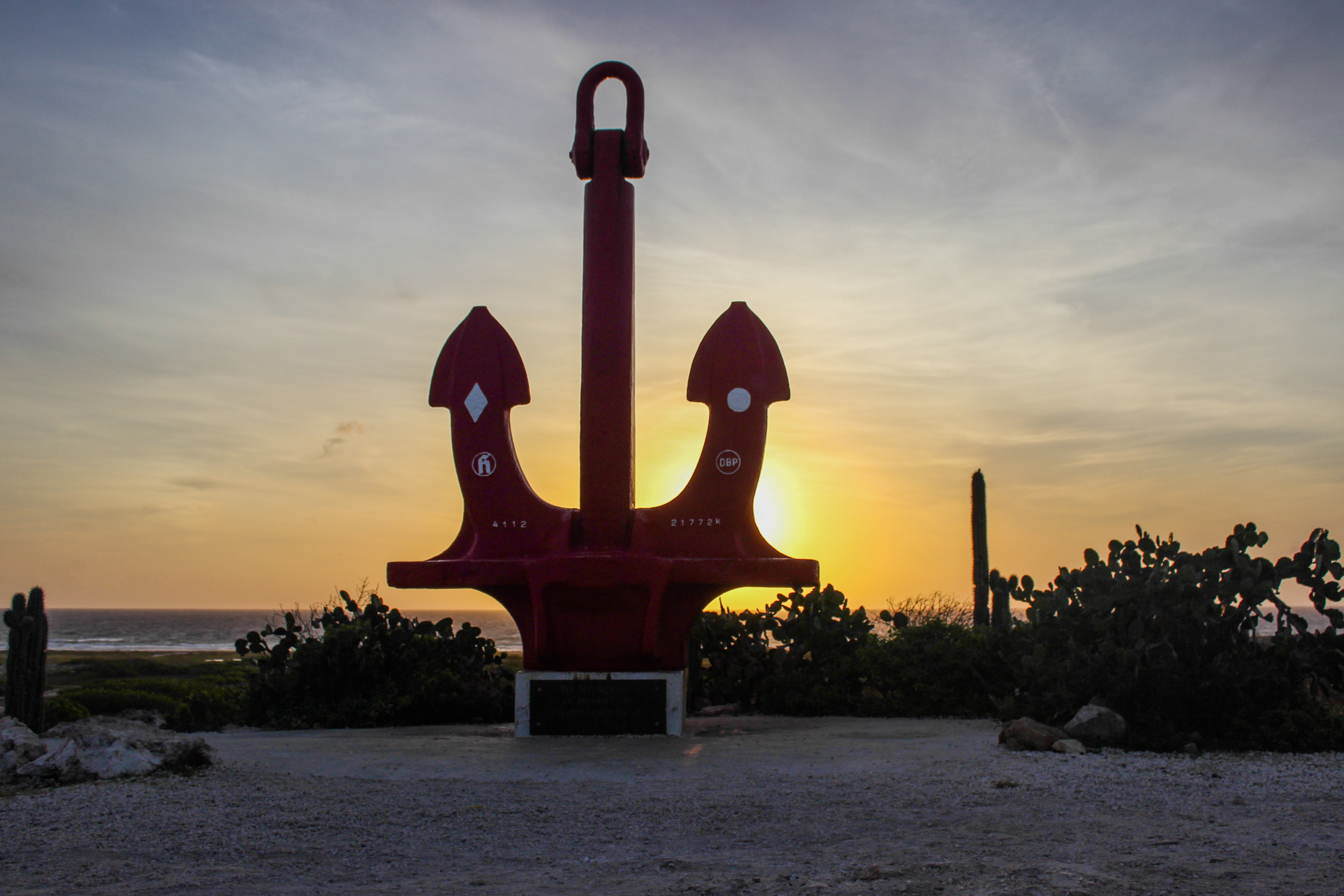
Anchor in Memory to All Seamen
