= Water Tower San Nicolas =

- Watertoren San Nicolas
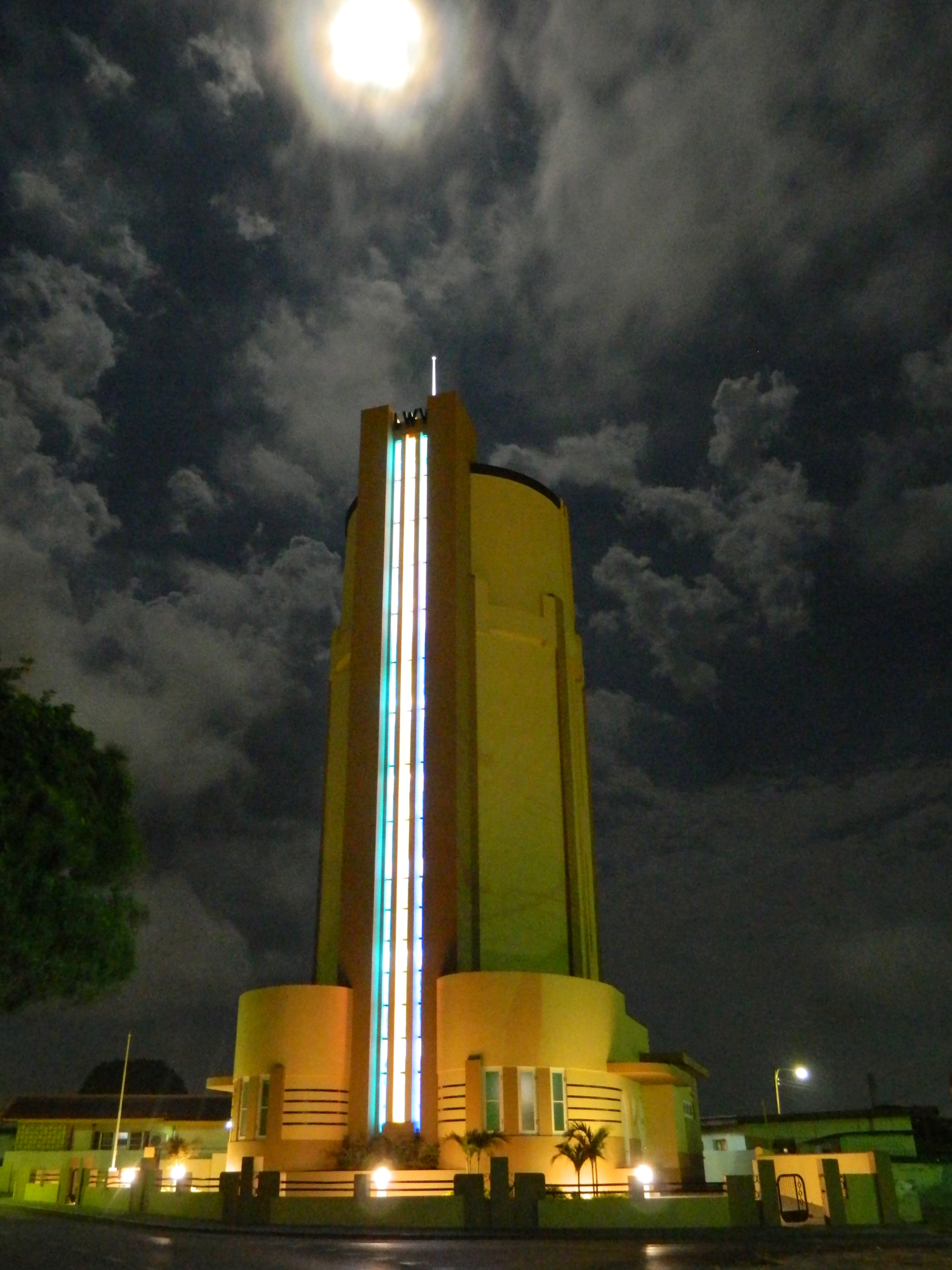
- Water Tower at night
- Interactive map of the Water Tower San Nicolas area

General information
- Architectural style: Art Deco
- Location: San Nicolaas, Aruba
- Coordinates: 12.43592°N 69.90911°W
- Current tenants: Industry Museum
- Inaugurated: August 1939

Height
- Height: 40 metres (130 ft)

Design and construction
- Architect: Pieter van Stuivenberg

Water Tower San Nicolas (Dutch: Watertoren San Nicolas) is a water tower and museum in San Nicolaas, Aruba. It was built in 1939 to relieve the water shortage in Aruba. In 1979, the tower became obsolete and in 1996, it was transferred to the monument fund and restored. In 2016, the industry museum opened in the tower.

== History ==
The island of Aruba used to depend on rainwater and wells for its drinking water. In 1928, Lago Oil (Exxon) and Shell opened refineries on the island. The population increase resulted in a water shortage which was temporarily relieved by shipments of drinking water from the United States. In 1933, a sea water desalination plant was constructed at Balashi. A distribution network was laid out, and it was decided to build water towers at Oranjestad and San Nicolaas.

In August 1939, the water tower was officially opened by governor Gielliam Wouters. The tower was designed by Pieter van Stuivenberg and is in Art Deco style. The lower parts were used as offices for the civil service and the water authority. The tower is 40 metres (130 ft) tall, and contained a 400 square metres (4,300 sq ft) reservoir located 25 metres (82 ft) above the sea water level. In the 1970s, three dry years resulted in the existing plant running close to capacity. In 1979, a larger desalination plant in Balashi was opened, and the water towers were rendered obsolete.

In 1996, ownership of the water tower was transferred to the monument fund which started to restore the building. On 8 March 2013, the tower was restored, and in 2016, the industry museum opened in the building.

== Industry museum ==
The industry museum provides an overview of the industrial activities on Aruba. It has displays of the gold, aloe, phosphate (guano) and oil industries which were present on the island. The public utility companies of Aruba have permanent exhibitions of their activities.
