= Lolita Euson =

Dutch Antillean writer and poet

- 1988
- Born: 27 October 1914; Sint Eustatius
- Died: 13 August 1994 (aged 79); Aruba
- Other names: Lolita E. Euson, Lolita Esmeralda Euson
- Occupations: writer, poet

Lolita Euson (27 October 1914 – 13 August 1994) was a Dutch Antillean writer and poet. She was invested as a Knight of the Order of Orange-Nassau, and streets in both Sint Eustatius and San Nicolaas, Aruba, bear her name. In 1996, she was memorialized by an Arubian stamp, which depicts her likeness.

== Biography ==
Lolita Esmeralda was born on the Dutch Antillean island of Sint Eustatius on 27 October 1914. (Note: Bon Dia and other newspapers misprinted the year of her birth as 1941. The stamp issued bearing her likeness shows 1914, and is more in line with Rutgers's statement that she relocated from Sint Eustatius to Aruba in 1936.) In 1936, she left Sint Eustatius and relocated to Aruba, where she won acclaim for her weekly columns in the periodical The Local. Euson published her first collection of poetry Sweet Praises in 1988, which won a Golden Poet Award from the World of Poetry in Sacramento, California and was celebrated in a ceremony in San Nicolaas by local dignitaries. The collection contained poems written in praise of various occasions, including national and religious themes, and touched on the death of President John F. Kennedy as well as themes concerning the Dutch royal family. Euson was invested as a Knight of the Order of Orange-Nassau.

== Death and legacy ==
Euson died on 13 August 1994 in Aruba. In 1995, her name was placed on a street in San Nicolas, Aruba. There is also a street which bears her name in Sint Eustatius. In 1996, a postage stamp bearing her likeness was issued in Aruba. Posthumously, poems written by Euson have been included in Klaas de Groot's 2010 anthology of Caribbean writers, Vaar naar de vuurtoren (Sail to the Lighthouse) and the 2014 volume, Moonlight on the Waves included previously unpublished poems by the author. Similar to her previous volume, the poems tend to focus on religious and holiday themes. She was the mother of the Caribbean singer Julio Euson.
