= International School of Aruba =

Non-profit private school in Aruba

Coordinates: 12°30′20″N 70°00′01″W

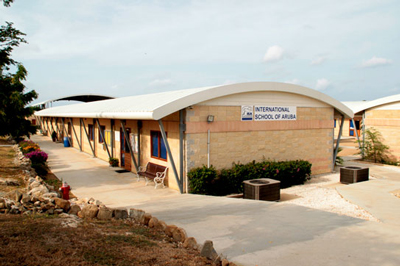

Information
- Established: 1929
- Enrollment: c.200

The International School of Aruba (ISA) is a non-profit private school in Aruba. In 2006, it moved to a new campus with a more centralized location.

It was founded in 1929 and was owned by Lago Oil and Transport Co. Ltd. From 1986 on, the school was governed by the ISA community and parent body. ISA was acquired by International School Services (ISS) in 2004. In 2005, a new campus was constructed and ISA was relocated to the residential neighbourhood of Wayaca.

ISA has approximately 200 students from Montessori through grade 12, comprising over 18 nationalities; the largest group of nationalities come from the Netherlands/ Aruba, Venezuela, United States/ Canada, and India. The average class size is 15 students to 1 teacher.

ISA had 23 faculty members for the 2009-2010 school year. The staff are from 8 countries including US citizens, Canadians, Dutch/Arubans, South American and other island nationalities.

== History ==
The first English school in Aruba was opened in Seroe Colorado in September, 1929. It was owned and operated by Lago Oil and Transport Co. Ltd. to provide for the schooling of the expatriates' children. During the 1960s, the school also opened to dependents of island residents on a tuition basis. With the closing of Lago in 1985, the parents of the remaining students formed the International School of Aruba (ISA), a non-profit Foundation, to continue English language education on the island.

In March 2004, the Board of Directors passed the governance and ownership of ISA to International Schools Services (ISS), a not-for-profit organization of Princeton, New Jersey.

ISS promised to fund a new school building for ISA as part of the transfer agreement, and financed the construction of the new campus.

== See also ==
- List of international schools § Aruba
