= San Nicolas Bay Reef Islands =

Islands in Aruba in the Dutch Caribbean

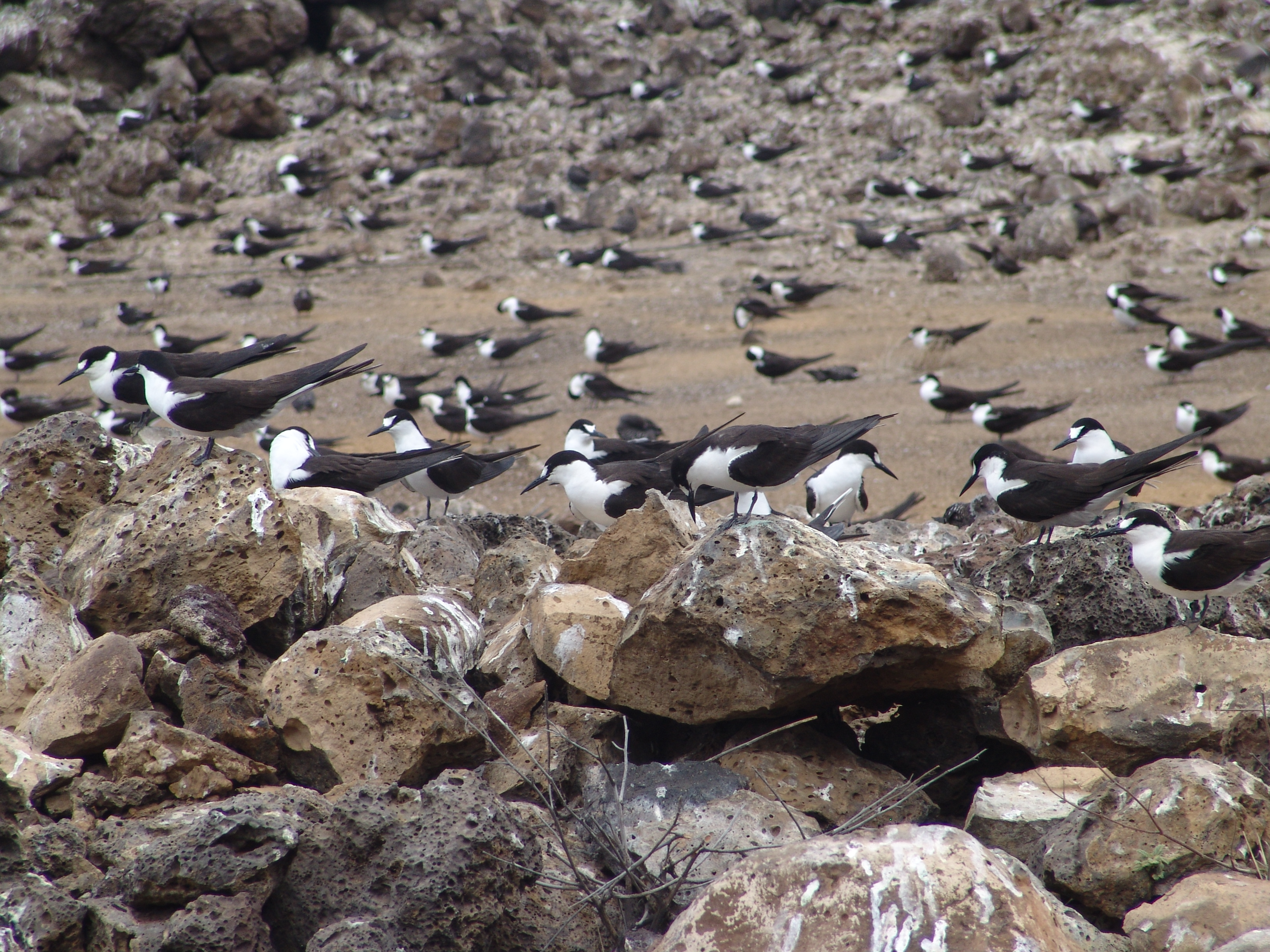
- Sooty terns breed on the islets

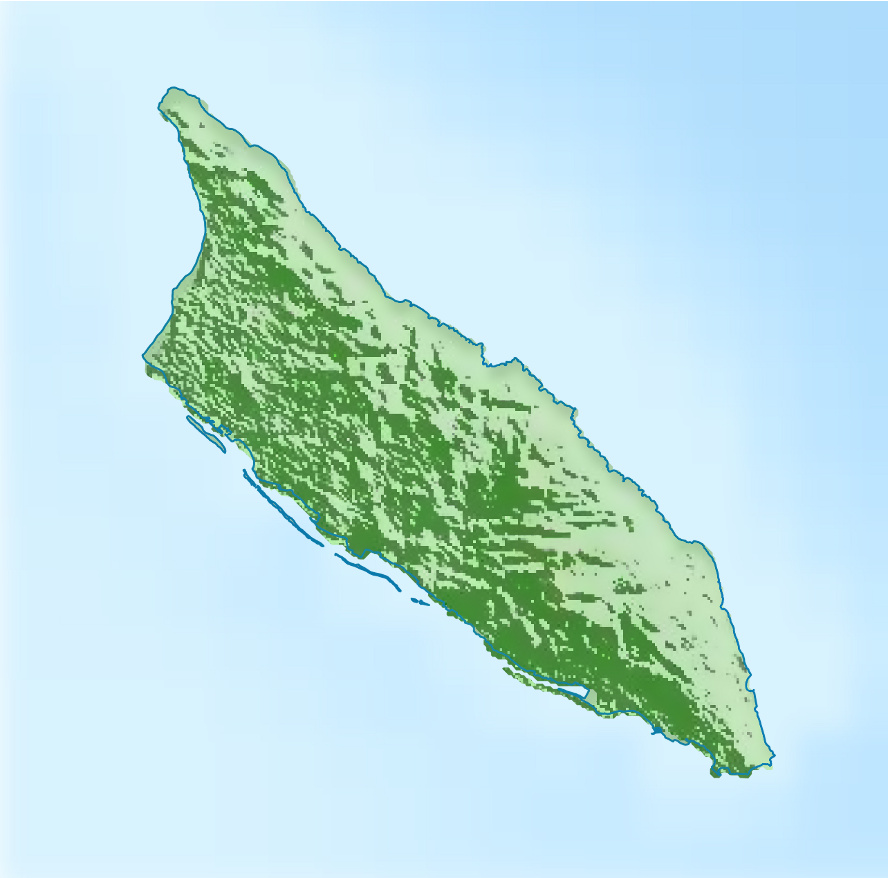
- Location within Aruba

Geography
- Location: San Nicolaas, Aruba
- Coordinates: 12°25′15″N 69°54′10″W

The San Nicolas Bay Reef Islands lie just off the south-eastern end of the island of Aruba, a constituent island nation of the Kingdom of the Netherlands in the Dutch Caribbean, adjacent to the island's second largest city San Nicolaas, from which it separated by a shallow lagoon. They form a 248 ha site encompassing five small boulder coral islets, on a substrate of submerged reef, which can vary in size and shape following winter storms and hurricanes. Three of the islets are covered with salt-resistant plants dominated by buttonwood, sea purslane and bay cedar. Aruban whiptail lizards have been recorded there. The area has been identified as an Important Bird Area by BirdLife International as a breeding site for several species of terns.

== Birds ==
Birds for which the IBA was designated include Sandwich, roseate, common, sooty, bridled, least and royal terns, as well as black and brown noddies. The main nesting season is from early April to mid-August. The main threat to the nesting birds is predation of eggs and chicks by laughing gulls. A potential threat is human disturbance.
