= Aruba Phosphate Company =

Guano industry of Aruba (1879–1914)

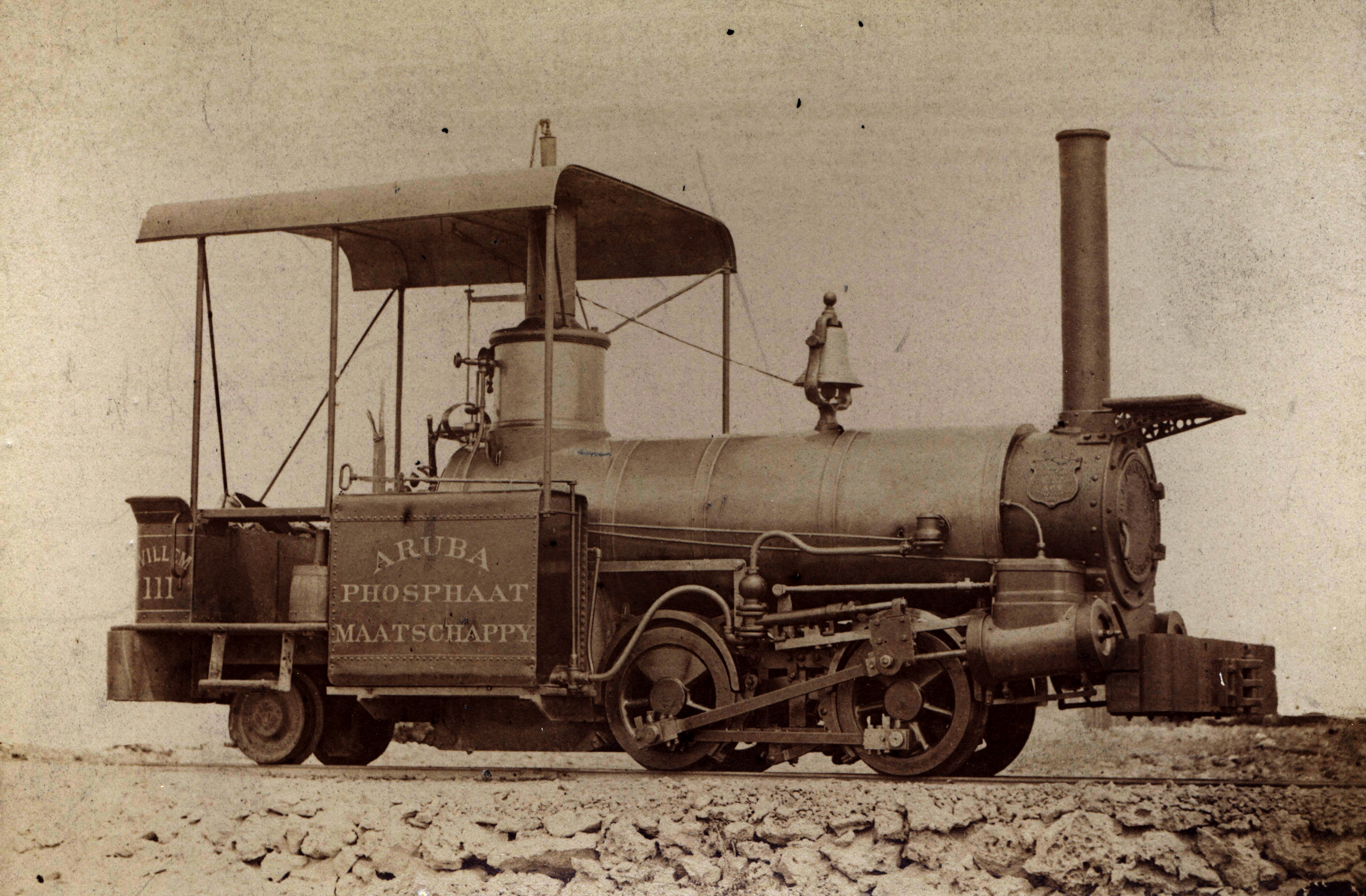
- Locomotive "Willem III" of Aruba Phosphate Company (1883)
- Native name: Aruba Phosphaat Maatschappij
- Industry: Guano
- Founded: 18 December 1879
- Founder: Charles Brodie Sewell
- Defunct: 2 June 1915
- Number of employees: Often more than 250

The discovery of guano on Klein Curaçao by John Godden in 1871, sparked a "guano mania" across the Antillean islands, including Curaçao (Santa Barbara). In 1874, J. H. Waters Gravenhorst is credited with the discovery of guano in Aruba, although an earlier interest was shown by an American named S.R. Kimball in 1859. (Note: Kimball, a ship-master of the Philadelphia Guano Society operating on Los Monges) The exact outcome of Kimball's efforts remains uncertain. This ultimately led to the incorporation of a limited company on Curaçao, known as Aruba Phosphate Company on December 18, 1879.

Phosphatized limestone deposits from guano droppings are exclusively located in the southeastern part of the island of Aruba, around two small hills: Seroe Colorado and Seroe Culebra. Additionally, in early 1909, phosphate was also discovered slightly further north, near a lower ridge named Bank Jerôme. The deposits resulted from large colonies of seafowls that foraged of the surrounding rich waters during late Pleistocene (about 1.8 million years Before Present).

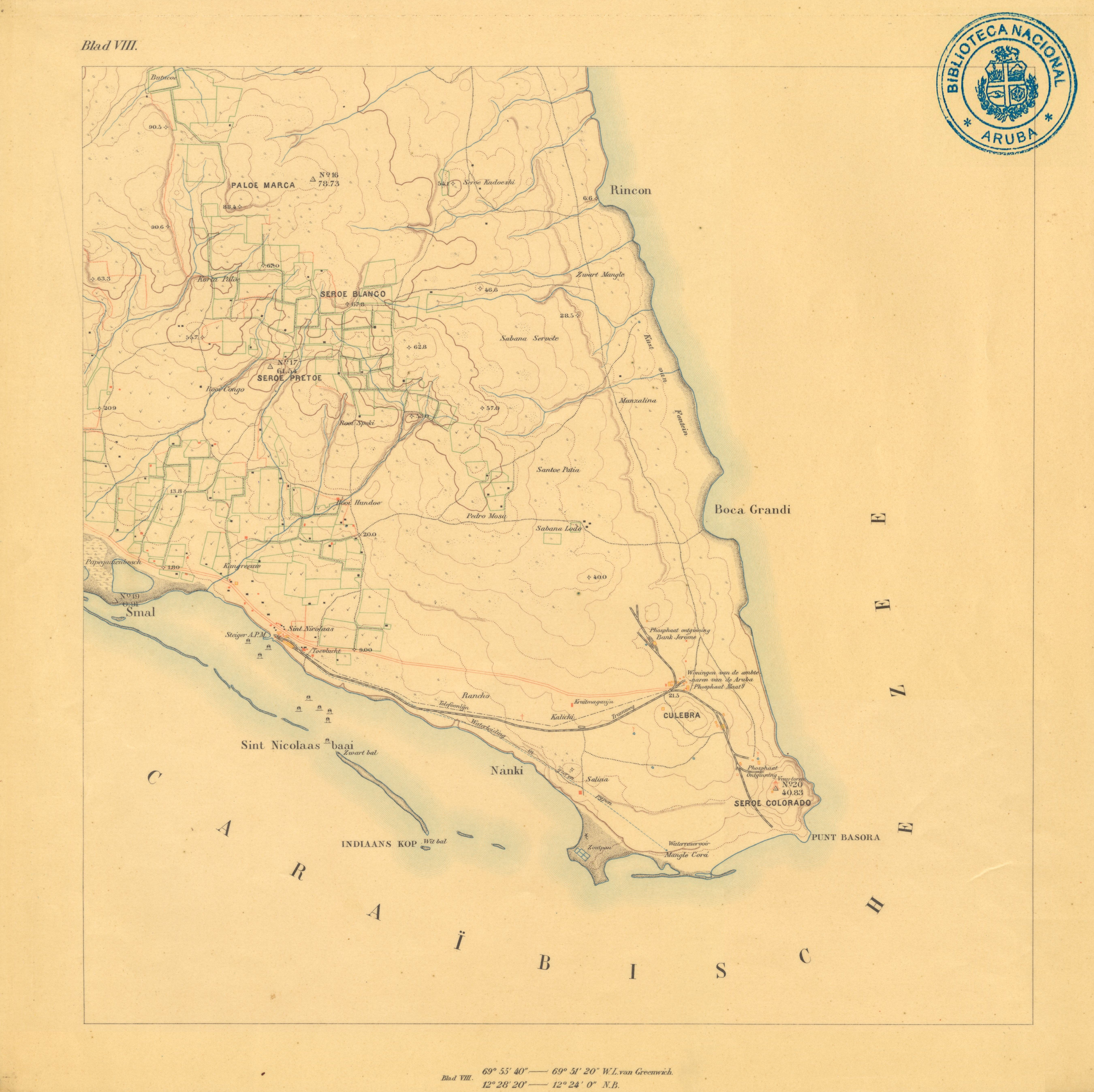
Key Locations in Aruba's Phosphate Industry: The furthest southeastern point of Aruba is where the Aruba Phosphate Company established itself, complete with the Seroe Colorado Lighthouse. Close to Seroe Culebra, the Director and officials of the company made their home. Further north, you'll find Bank Jerôme. These strategic sites were all linked by Decauville railway that extended to St. Nicolas Bay.

== History ==
=== Concession ===
==== Acquisition ====
The Aruba Island Gold Mining Company in London became entangled in a prolonged legal dispute with the colonial government. In 1867, Francisco de Isola was granted the "exclusive right to mine the land holding minerals on Aruba" for a 25-year period. This concession was later transferred to the Aruba Island Gold Mining Company, which then staked its claim on the phosphate deposits. However, during a session on June 1, 1877, the Court of Appeal at The Hague ruled that the term "minerals" in the concession exclusively referred to metals and ores containing metals, excluding phosphatic lime. Consequently, no concession had been granted for the phosphate at Seroe Colorado.

This verdict granted complete control over the phosphate deposits to the colonial administration. The concession was put up for auction, and on January 7, 1879, it was awarded to a British resident named Charles Brodie Sewell, who, however, acted in consultation with the Aruba Island Gold Mining Company. This concession permitted C.B. Sewell to exploit and export Aruba phosphates.

==== Exploitation ====
In the case of a concession on Klein Curaçao, the government had previously imposed a fee of one guilder per cubic meter, allowing the concession holder to amass wealth quickly. However, on Aruba, the concession fee was set at eight guilders per exported cubic meter (ton), with a mandatory annual export requirement of at least 12,000 cubic meters. This fee was distinct from a modest export duty, which included harbor charges.

Prominent shareholders consistently and successfully advocated for a reduction in concession rights and associated privileges. In 1885, the total fees for the concession right were eight guilders per ton, but by 1895, they had decreased to five guilders, further declining to one guilder in 1897, and finally reaching fifty cents in 1899. C.B. Sewell sold his concession for eight guilders per ton, amassing 1,062,000 guilders between 1884 and 1889 alone.

=== Capital ===
The initial capital of the company was 226,000 guilders divided into 113 shares of 2,000 guilders each. Of these shares, 56 represented an amount of 112,000 guilders belonged to C.B. Sewell. The remaining 57 shares, 56 were taken up by other founders of the company. The one remaining share was left at the disposal of the company.

The initial capital of the company was just 112,000 guilders, which soon proved insufficient. To sustain operations, the Company secured a loan of 84,000 guilders, with the 56 shareholders from Curaçao contributing 1,500 guilders per share.

The Company exhibited diligence, dedication, and financial prudence in completing preparatory tasks.

Mining of the substance began promptly; a general agent for phosphate sales was appointed in London; chemical analyses were performed. Within roughly eighteen months, the first shipment from Aruba became feasible.

The borrowed loan was repaid as early as May 1883. Dividends exceeding 14,000 guilders were paid out from 1883 to 1893 on each 2,000 guilders share. Additionally, more than 230,000 guilders was allocated to the Aruba Island Gold Mining Company, as its rightful portion of the company's profits based on the contract during the concession acquisition. By 1914, the value of exports reached a sum of nine million guilders.

=== Aruba phosphate ===
The concession consisted of 2 areas, one covering 24 hectares (59 acres) and the other 60 hectares (150 acres). In the phosphates, there are distinctions between the first type with over 70% calcium phosphate and no more than 3.5% iron oxide. All other phosphates are referred to as the second type and, due to their high iron content, were largely unsellable. The color of the phosphate varies from yellow to a reddish-brown or liver-like hue. Its texture is firm and brittle.

==== Transportation and extraction ====
The process of phosphate shipment in Aruba used to be time-consuming and expensive. Because of their draft, vessels couldn't load their cargo close to the wharf. Consequently, phosphate had to be transported using lighters. To tackle this issue, an iron pier had to be built where vessels could dock directly to receive their cargo from the trucks, eliminating this inconvenience. The Delaware Bridge Company of New York completed the construction of the iron pier in August 1883. The pier served its purpose exceptionally well, allowing vessels of approximately 300 tons to be loaded in just one day.

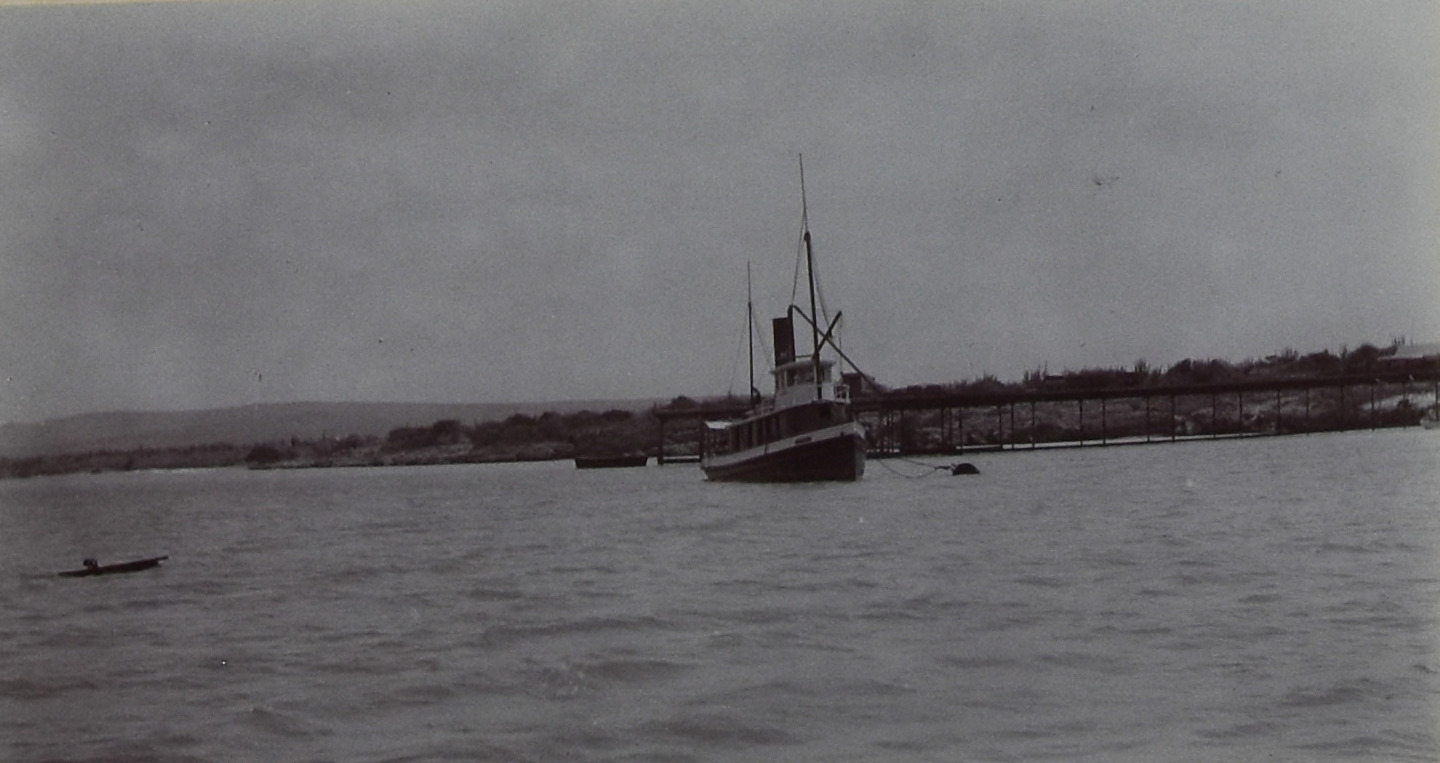
S.S. Phosphate at the pier of the Aruba Phosphate Company in St. Nicolaas Bay (before 1904)

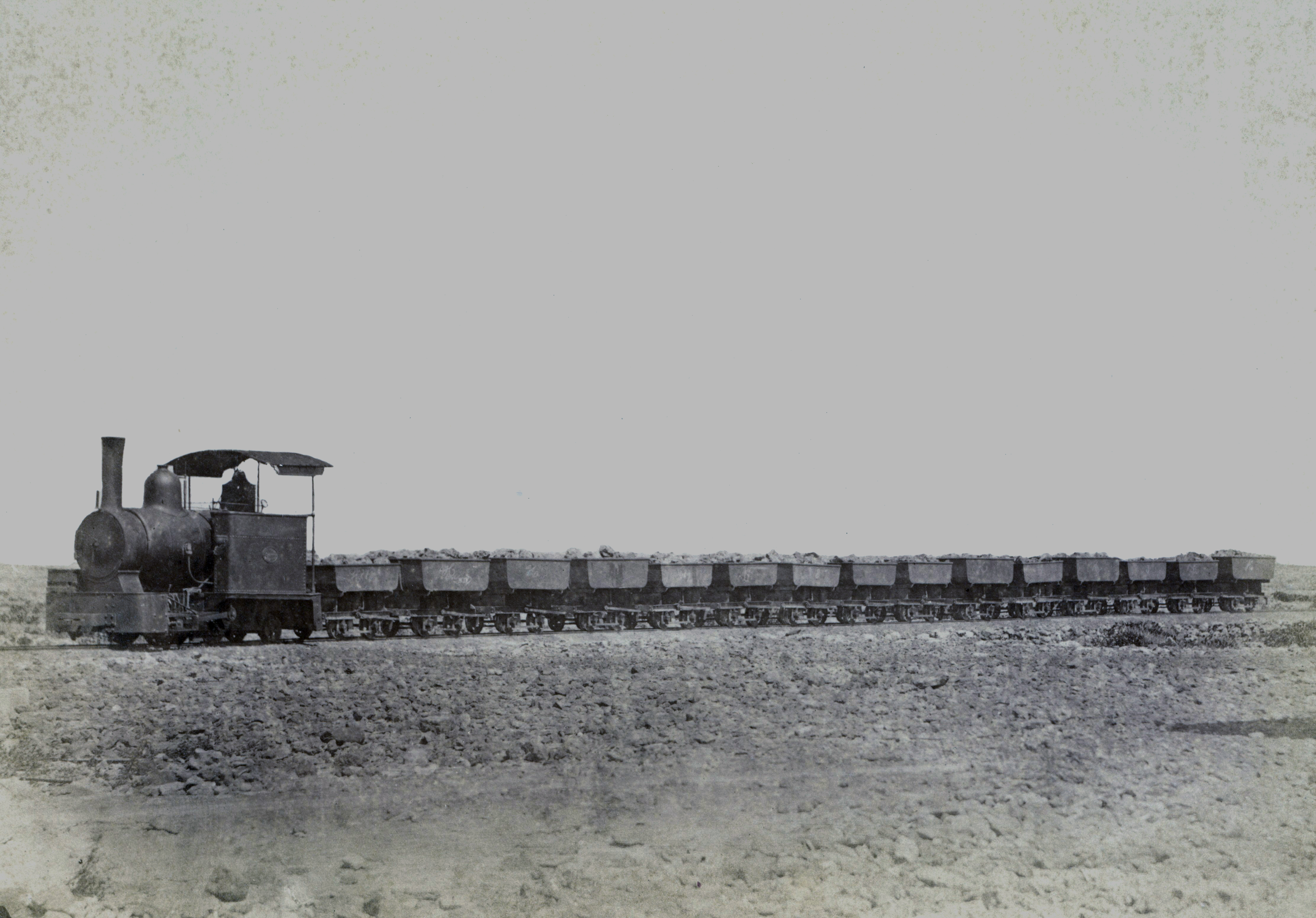
Locomotive with fifiteen loaded freight cars (1883)

The soil consisted of a layer of 12 feet of limestone, beneath which lay a thickness of 4 feet (1.2 m) to about 30 feet (9.1 m) of phosphate, resting on older geological formations. These phosphates were extracted and transported from Seroe Colorado. The journey from the mines to the loading pier involved twenty-car trains propelled by a light locomotive along a narrow gauge track.

===== Phosphate formations =====
Initially, these phosphate deposits were discovered on Seroe Colorado hill, and there was an initial belief in the presence of a significant quantity of the substance. However, it turned out that this was not the case. The phosphate layer was not very thick, and the usable substance would have been quickly depleted if it weren't for the discovery of underground layers during the excavation of a well.

These underground deposits were at a depth of approximately 20 metres (66 ft). The deeper extraction, presented greater challenges and incurred higher costs. The material from these underground mines had to be spread out in open areas for drying by the sun and wind before it could be suitable for shipment. Drying the material in ovens was considered but deemed impractical due to the associated high costs, including coal consumption.

===== Mining process =====
In phosphate mines, hand-drilled holes, about 3 feet (0.91 m) deep, were used to blast phosphate with dynamite. As the mines deepened, miners excavated beneath a rock roof, leaving phosphate pillars for support. Once the entire phosphate layer was extracted, these pillars were removed, and roof collapses were inevitable. The deeper portion was extracted by establishing a shaft from which significantly large tunnels radiated.

=== Capacity ===
In the initial year of export, spanning from August 1881 to the end of August 1882, a sum of 199,247.52 guilders was paid in royalties to the Colonial treasury for the cargo carried by forty vessels, collectively measuring 24,905.94 cubic meters. Up until 1895, the Colonial Treasury received over 2 million guilders. This suggests that approximately 250,000 tons of phosphate were exported during that period.

Over a span of 28 years (1881 to 1909), statistics reveal that a total of 742,561 registered tons of phosphate were exported from San Nicolas to France, England, Denmark, and America where it is processed into superphosphate by treatment with sulfuric acid and then used as fertilizer.

=== San Nicolas development ===
San Nicolas emerged as the phosphate export hub, sparking settlement expansion. Initially marked by a few fishermen's huts, this area experienced significant growth following the company's incorporation. Most of the houses at San Nicolas were constructed by the company, and immigrant labor, particularly from Italy, (Note: Among them, four individuals chose to make Aruba their permanent home: Antonio and Victorio Petrocci, Eugenio Falconi, and Cajetano Jacopucci. These individuals settled in the area known as Tanki Leendert.) played a pivotal role in propelling the industry forward.

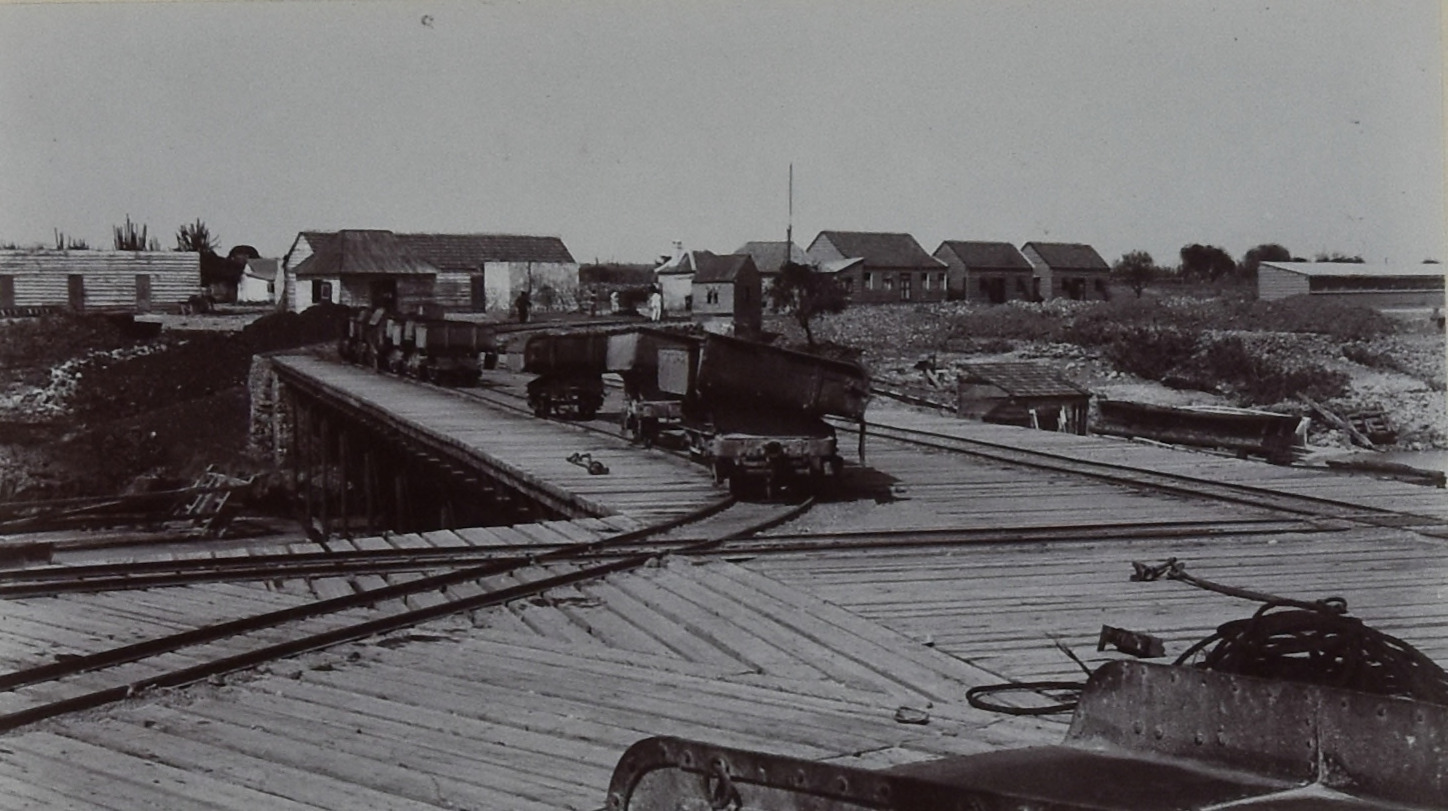
View of the pier and houses at San Nicolas Bay (1904)

The exploitation of phosphate played a significant role in driving the expansion of San Nicolas. This growth was accompanied by the establishment of modern infrastructure, including the construction of an iron landing and a six-kilometer-long 762 millimetres (2.5 ft) narrow-gauge Decauville railway designed for transporting phosphate to the harbor. The Aruba Phosphate Company even possessed its own steam tugboat, the S.S. Phosphate, and pilot to ensure the safe navigation in and out the San Nicolas bay since November 1882. (Note: The current tugboat was deemed inadequate for towing heavily loaded vessels out of the harbor in all situations. Concerns raised by captains of larger vessels led to the procuring of a more powerful tugboat. This new tugboat, including insurance and voyage charges to Curaçao, cost approximately 50,000 guilders.) Upon arrival at the harbor, the phosphate was dispatched to numerous countries for production of superphosphate fertilizer. The implementation of an efficient loading process notably reduced ship-loading time from fifteen to five days.

==== Economy ====
This period of phosphate exploitation significantly boosted Aruba's revenues and supported the colony of Curaçao. In the past, Aruba faced a scarcity of currency. To address this, the Aruba Phosphate Company introduced its own form of "currency" into circulation. Despite this unconventional approach, the company proved to be a source of prosperity.

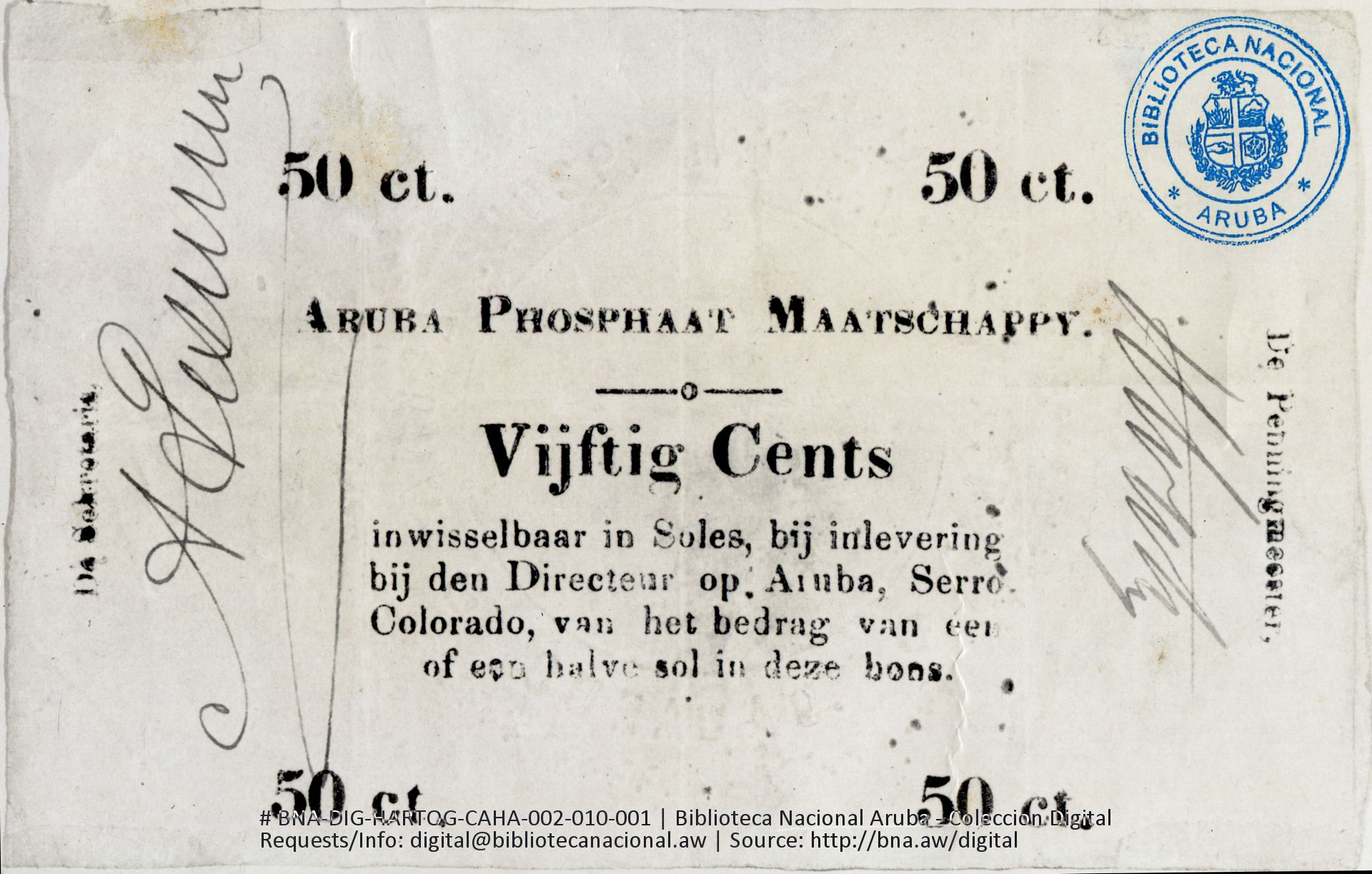
Fifty Cents. Redeemable in soles, upon delivery to the Director at, Aruba, Seroe Colorado, of the amount of one or a half sol in these vouchers

A substantial workforce, often exceeding 250 individuals, had stable employment, receiving their wages in cash each week. These workers earned a weekly wage of five to six guilders. Dutch guilders per week benefited the poor population of the island. Notably, the Aruba Phosphate Company did not engage in trading provisions and groceries; instead, these essential items were provided as part of the workers' wage compensation.

The funds introduced into circulation on a weekly basis yielded benefits for the entire island population. Local shopkeepers made sales, while schooner and small ship owners maintained ongoing vessel operations. This facilitated the consistent transport of vital supplies from Curaçao and nearby cities in Venezuela and Colombia to the island.

==== Welfare ====
A worker lost his hand in a dynamite explosion while working for the company but was unable to receive any pension.

=== Decline ===
In 1900–1901, the company's profit amounted to only 17,055 guilders. During this period, the state of the company was characterized as challenging, primarily because reduced freight rates for Florida phosphate to Europe enabled American miners to compete fiercely with Aruba. Furthermore, efforts to increase prices were hindered by the continuous growth of phosphate exports from Algiers and Tunis.

The early 20th century saw a decline in phosphate profitability due to factors such as deeper extraction, poorer quality, and competition from other sources. World War I further strained the industry, leading to the ceasing of Aruba Phosphate Company activities by 18 August 1914. The company dissolved on 2 June 1915, with workers seeking employment in neighboring countries.

== Sources ==
- Alofs, L.; Merkies, L. (2001). "Economische ontwikkelingen in de 19e eeuw" [Economic Developments in the 19th Century]. Ken ta Arubiano? : sociale integratie en natievorming op Aruba, 1924-2001 [Who is Aruban? : Social Integration and Nation Formation on Aruba, 1924-2001]. Oranjestad: VAD/De Wit Stores.
- Derix, Ruud (2019). The history of resource exploitation in Aruba: Landscape series 2 (Report) (published 2016).
- Hartog, J. (1961). Aruba : Past and Present : From the Time of the Indians until Today. Translated by J.A. Verleun. Oranjestad: D.J. de Wit.
- Jesurun, A. (1882). Aruba Phosphaat Maatschappij (1881-1882) Beredeneerd Verslag [Aruba Phosphate Company (1881-1882) Motivated Report] (Report).
- Jesurun, A. (1883). Aruba Phosphaat Maatschappij (1882-1883) Beredeneerd Verslag [Aruba Phosphate Company (1882-1883) Motivated Report] (Report).
- Kol, H.H. van (1904). "Aruba". Naar de Antillen en Venezuela [To the Antilles and Venezuela]. Leiden: A.W. Sijthoff.
- Kol, H.H. van (1901). Een Noodlijdende Kolonie [A Suffering Colony]. Amst.-Rott.: Masereeuw & Bouten.
- Lago Oil and Transport Co. Ltd. (1940). A History of Aruba (14th ed.). Pan-Aruban.
- Zwan, J. van der; Merryweather, S. (1948). "Aruba Gedurende Vijftig Jaar" [Aruba During Fifty Years]. Oranje en de zes Caraibische parelen : officieel gedenkboek ter gelegenheid van het gouden regeringsjubileum van hare majesteit Koningin Wilhelmina Helena [Orange and the Six Caribbean Pearls: Official Commemorative Book on the Occasion of the Golden Reign Jubilee of Her Majesty Queen Wilhelmina Helena.] (in Dutch). Amsterdam: De Bussy. pp. 405–408. OCLC 906322310.
