= San Nicolaas English =

Caribbean English dialect spoken in San Nicolaas, Aruba

- Region: Aruba
- Native speakers: 15.000 (estimation)
- Language family: Indo-European: Germanic; West Germanic; North Sea Germanic; Anglo–Frisian; Anglic; English; Caribbean English; San Nicolaas English
- Early forms: Old English: Middle English; Early Modern English
- Dialects: San Nicolaas English
- Writing system: Latin

Language codes
- ISO 639-3: –

San Nicolaas English, also known as Bush English, is a variety of Caribbean English spoken in the town of San Nicolaas in Aruba. It is spoken by many of the town's estimated 15.000 residents. It is also spoken by a smaller number of speakers in other parts of Aruba. San Nicolaas English is often spoken alongside Papiamento, one of the official languages of Aruba. San Nicolaas English is also known as Bush English, Sani English, We English, Village Talk, etc.

== History ==
San Nicolaas English is said to have developed from varieties of Caribbean English and English creoles brought over by labor migrants from the English-speaking Caribbean nations and territories such as Trinidad and Tobago and Grenada, who settled in San Nicolaas throughout the 20th century. Mainly to work in jobs related to the Aruban oil industry, located near the town. Migration to the oil refinery zone in the 1920s–30s brought together diverse Caribbean English speakers in San Nicolas. In a Papiamento-centric environment, English Creole speakers blended their speech with features from Papiamento (lexicon, grammar, particles), Dutch, and Spanish.

San Nicolaas English has had a profound impact on Aruba's local carnival music scene, with many contributions made by speakers to Aruban Calypso and Road March music.

Today, San Nicolaas English is spoken by many of San Nicolaas' inhabitants and by a smaller number residing in other parts of Aruba originally from the town, including by many Arubans and immigrants both of British Caribbean and non-British Caribbean descent.
