= San Nicolaas =

San Nicolas Sint Nicolas
- Town
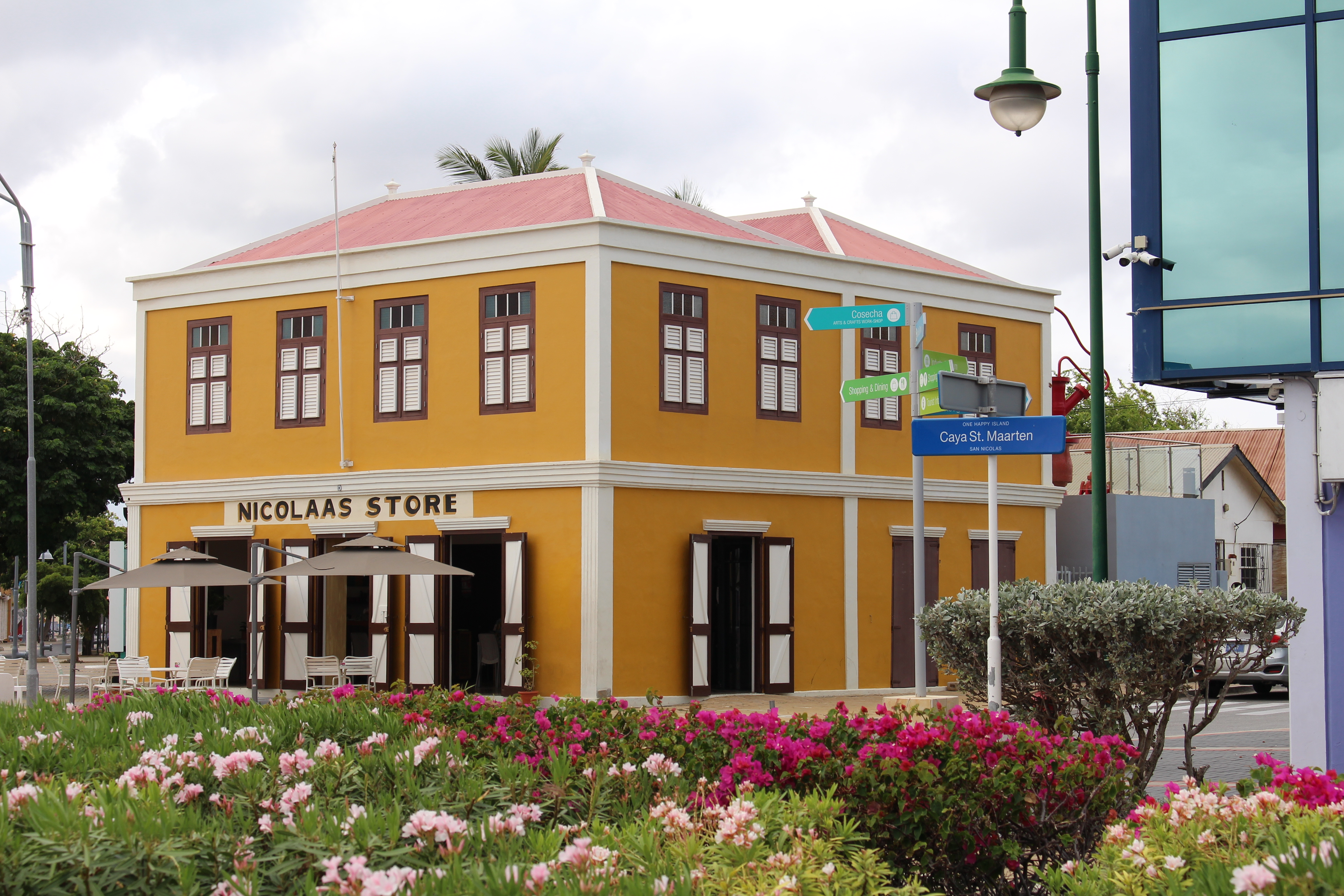
- Nicolaas Store in 2018
- Motto: The sunrise side
- Interactive map of San Nicolas
- Coordinates: 12°26′N 69°55′W
- Country: Aruba
- Region: San Nicolas Noord; San Nicolas Zuid

Area
  - Total: 33.998 km^{2} (13.127 sq mi)

Population (2020)
  - Total: 14,175
  - Density: 839/km^{2} (2,170/sq mi)
- Time zone: UTC-4 (AST)
- Climate: BSh

San Nicolas (Dutch: Sint Nicolaas) is 19 kilometres (12 mi) southeast of Oranjestad, and is Aruba's second largest city. As of 2010 it has a population of 15,283, many of whom originate from the British Caribbean and the rest of the Caribbean.

== History ==
According to oral tradition, San Nicolaas was named after a Mr. Nicolaas van der Biest (1808–1873), who owned a big piece of the land there. Landowners were then addressed by their subordinates by their first names preceded by 'Shon' meaning 'master'. So he was called 'Shon Nicolaas', as was the area. It is thought that the change from Shon Nicolas to San Nicolaas was due to the influence of Spanish.

Many Afro-Arubans settled in San Nicolaas during the 1920s, attracted by the many jobs associated with the oil refinery. Immigrants from other Latin-American and Caribbean countries would also later settle the town. Some residents speak a little studied native variety of English Creole, known as San Nicolaas English. This English Creole is known locally by many names, including Bush English, Sani English, We English, Village Talk, etc.

== Oil Refinery ==
Known as the island's Sunrise Side, San Nicolaas was once a bustling company town, when Lago Oil and Transport Company opened its oil refinery in 1924 until 1985 when Exxon Corporation closed it and began to dismantle the facility as well as the Colony. In 1991 Coastal Corporation reopened the oil refinery until 1995. It was then sold to Valero in 2004, and it was open for a number of years, and closed in 2009. In December 2010, Valero announced plans to reopen the refinery. The refinery later was purchased by Citgo Petroleum Corporation, which transferred the property to the Government of Aruba in 2020. As of July 2021, plans to build a modern facility on the site had not gone forward.

== Landmarks ==
The Nicolaas Store is a former book store in the centre of the city which has been converted into the Community Museum.

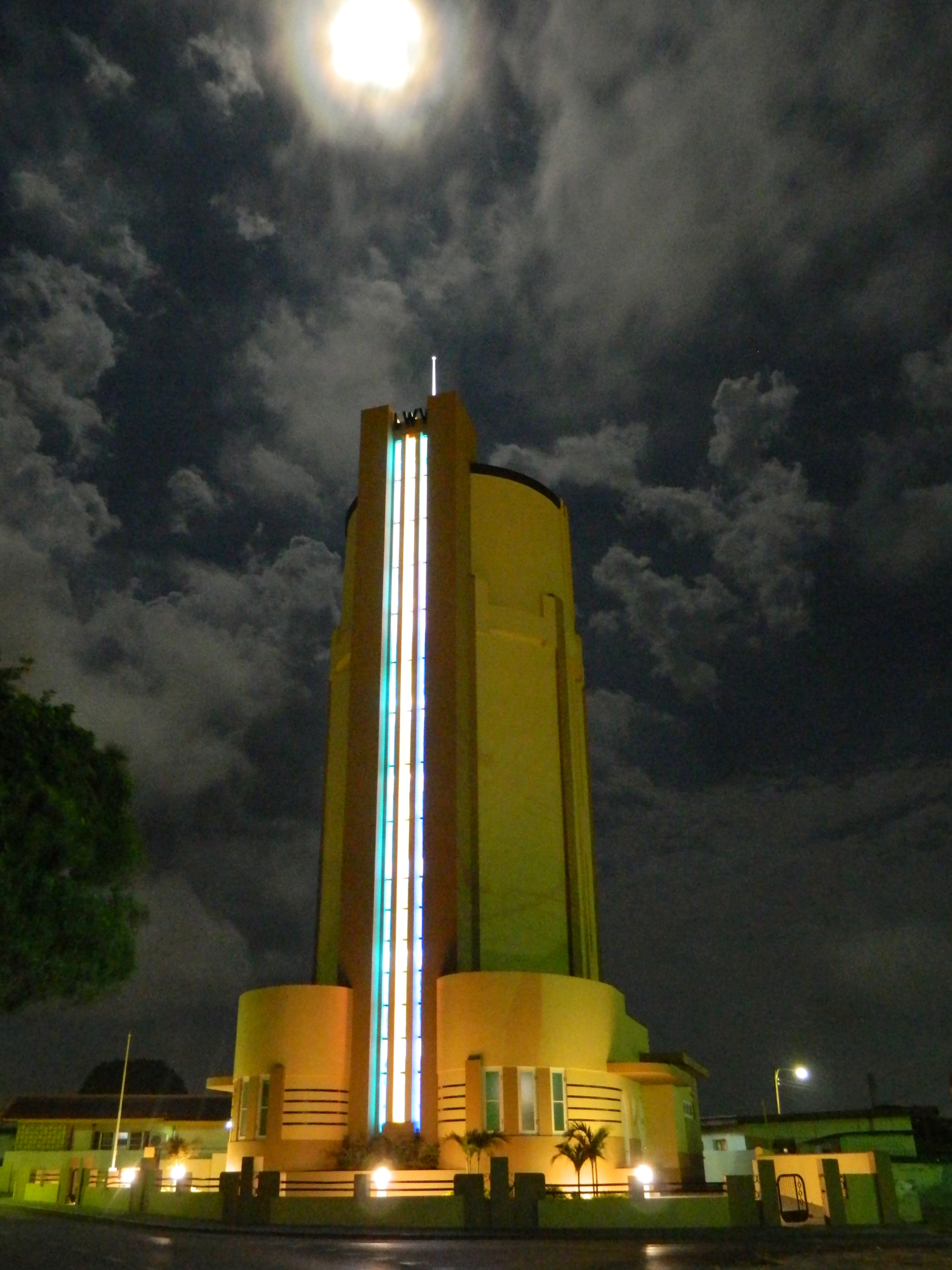
Water Tower San Nicolas at night

Water Tower San Nicolas was built in 1939 by the LMV (Landswatervoorziening) to help supply potable water to the community. The structure was restored in 2013, and became the site of the Museum of Industry.

The Model Trains Museum is located at Koolbaaibergstraat 12.

The Sunrise Solar Park, with a capacity of 7.5 MW of power, is installed here.

A section of San Nicolaas' main street has been converted to a picturesque promenade with shops containing souvenirs, crafts and local snacks. There are over 50 hand-painted murals in San Nicolaas.

In nearby Seroe Colorado, there is a small natural bridge, not to be confused with the bridge at Andicuri. To view the bridge follow the road to its terminus, then hike approximately 200 feet (61 m) down old lava and coral formations.

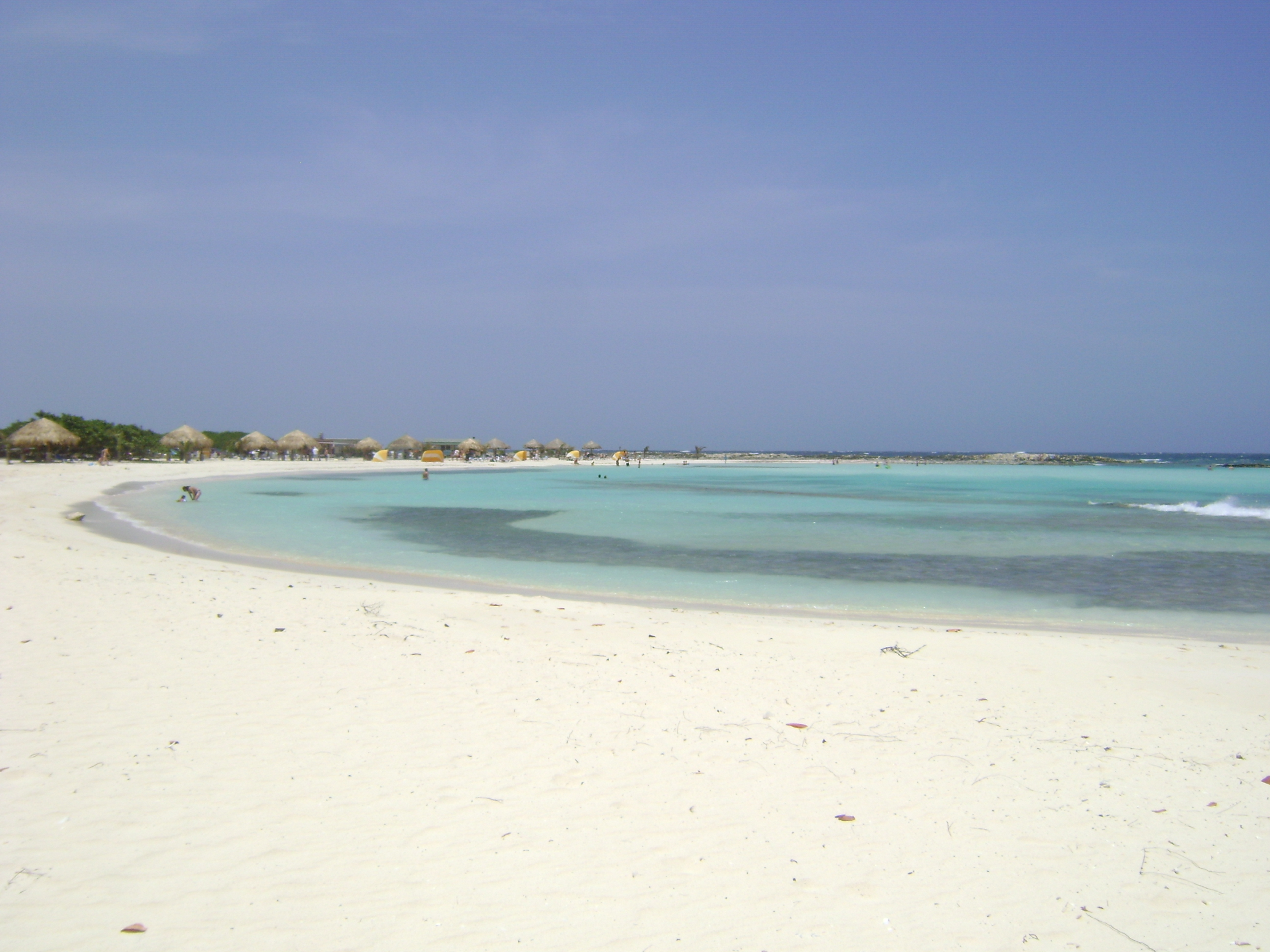
Baby Beach, Aruba

Baby Beach, known for its calm water and good snorkeling, is located south of San Nicolaas.

The San Nicolas Bay Reef Islands Important Bird Area lies just off the coast from the town, and is an important site for nesting terns.

Close to San Nicolaas, a Dutch marine camp is off Commanders Bay near the fishing village of Savaneta.

== Sports ==
- On August 22, 2010, San Nicolaas, Aruba, won the Senior League World Series in Bangor, Maine.
- The PaloMarga International Raceway hosts drag races.

== Notable people ==
- Xander Bogaerts (1992), baseball player.
- Bobby Farrell (1949–2010), singer and dancer.

== See also ==
- Aruba Phosphate Company
