= Historical Museum of Aruba =

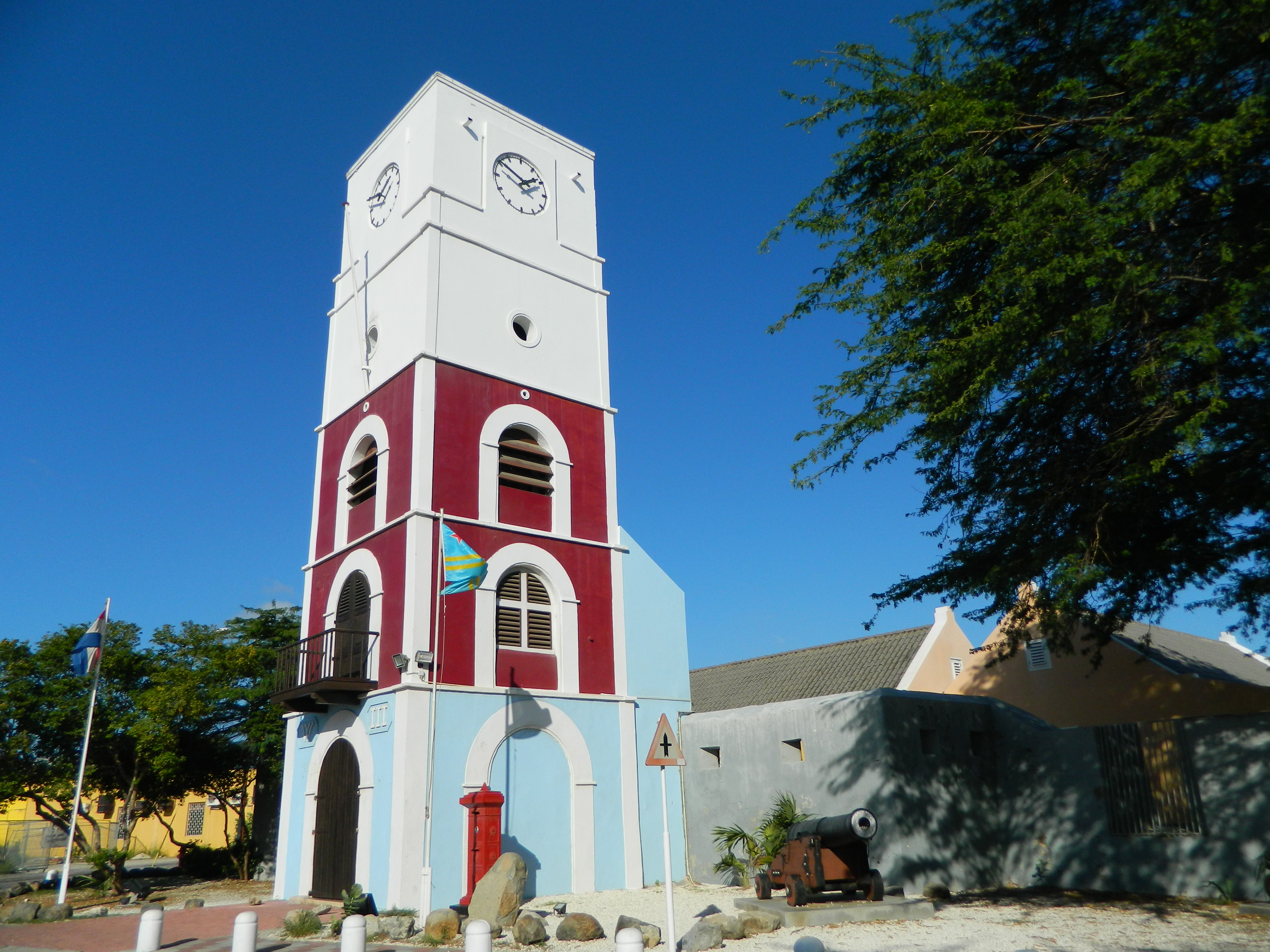
- Fort Zoutman and the Willem III Tower in 2013

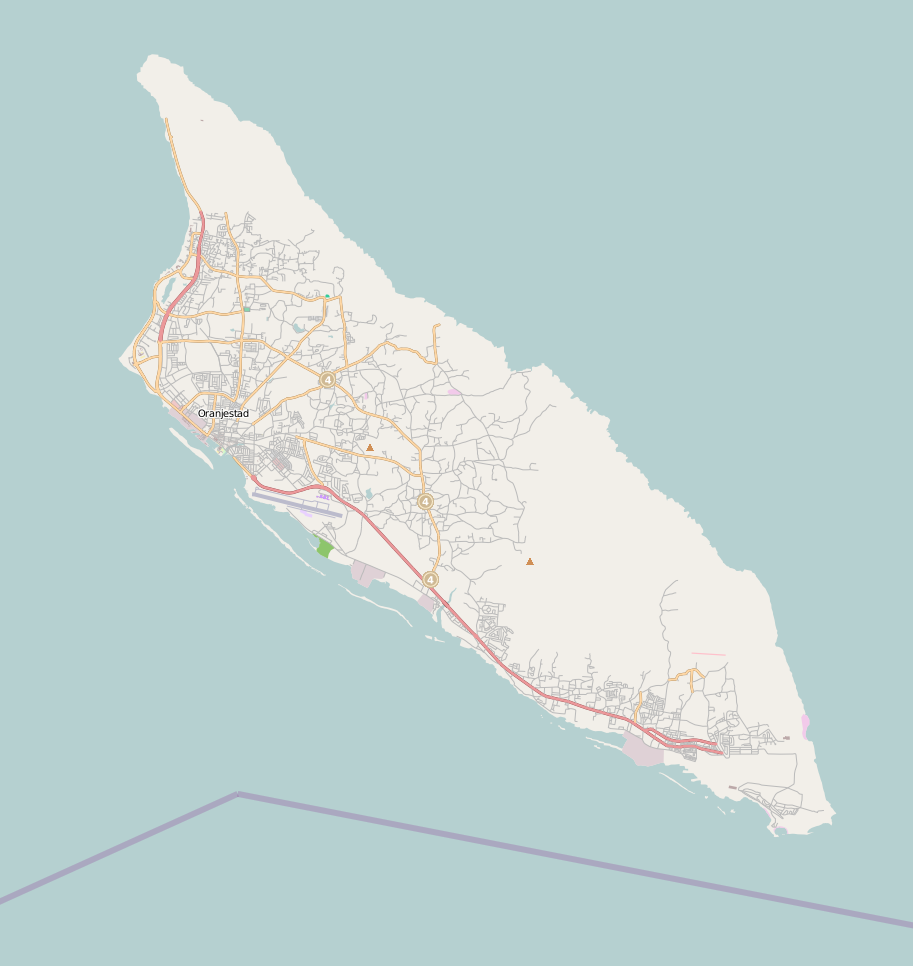
- Location in Aruba
- Location: Fort Zoutman; Zoutmanstraat z/n Oranjestad, Aruba
- Coordinates: 12.5176°N 70.0356°W
- Type: Historical museum

The Historical Museum of Aruba is a historical museum in the city of Oranjestad in Aruba. It explains the history of the island and its inhabitants, in rural and urban areas.

The museum is situated in Fort Zoutman, an 18th and 19th-century military fortification.

The museum is administrated by the Fundacion Museo Arubano (Aruban Museum Foundation) since 1992.

== See also ==
- List of museums in Aruba
