= Festivals in Aruba =

Festivals in Aruba take place throughout the year on the island. The island waived COVID-19 testing requirements in 2022 to increase the number of visitors.

== Aruba Summer Music Festival ==
The Aruba Summer Music Festival is a Latin music festival. It is celebrated at the end of June every year and lasts for 2 days.

== Bon Bini Festival ==
The Bon Bini Festival takes place in Fort Zoutman, Oranjestad every Tuesday from 7:00 PM to 8:30 PM throughout the year with Antillean dancers, drum music, cultural food, and art.

== Soul Beach Music Festival ==
The Soul Beach Music Festival is a multi-night concert series held Memorial Day weekend. The attendees take part in nightclub events, beach parties, concerts, and comedy shows. As of 2025, the Soul Beach Music Festival is returning to the island of Sint Maarten where the festival originated.

== Aruba International Film Festival ==
The Aruba International Film Festival typically takes place over a week in June. In 2015, thirteen films were screened.

== Caribbean Sea Jazz Festival: Aruba ==
The Caribbean Sea Jazz Festival in Aruba is an outdoor festival featuring local and international jazz musicians. The festival presents local and international bands and artists over a two-day event in October. While jazz music is the focus, other artistic elements including dance, poetry, and art are also included in the program.

== Dande Festival ==
The Dande Festival is one of the biggest musical events in Aruba, and takes place in the last week of December. The festival features over 50 singers performing their original music along with traditional Dande songs for the new year.

== Carnival ==
Carnival is a month-long celebration. Activities in this festival include music competitions, pageants, street parties and parades. This celebration started in 1954 in Aruba.
