= Virginia Demetricia =

Enslaved Aruban (1842–1863)

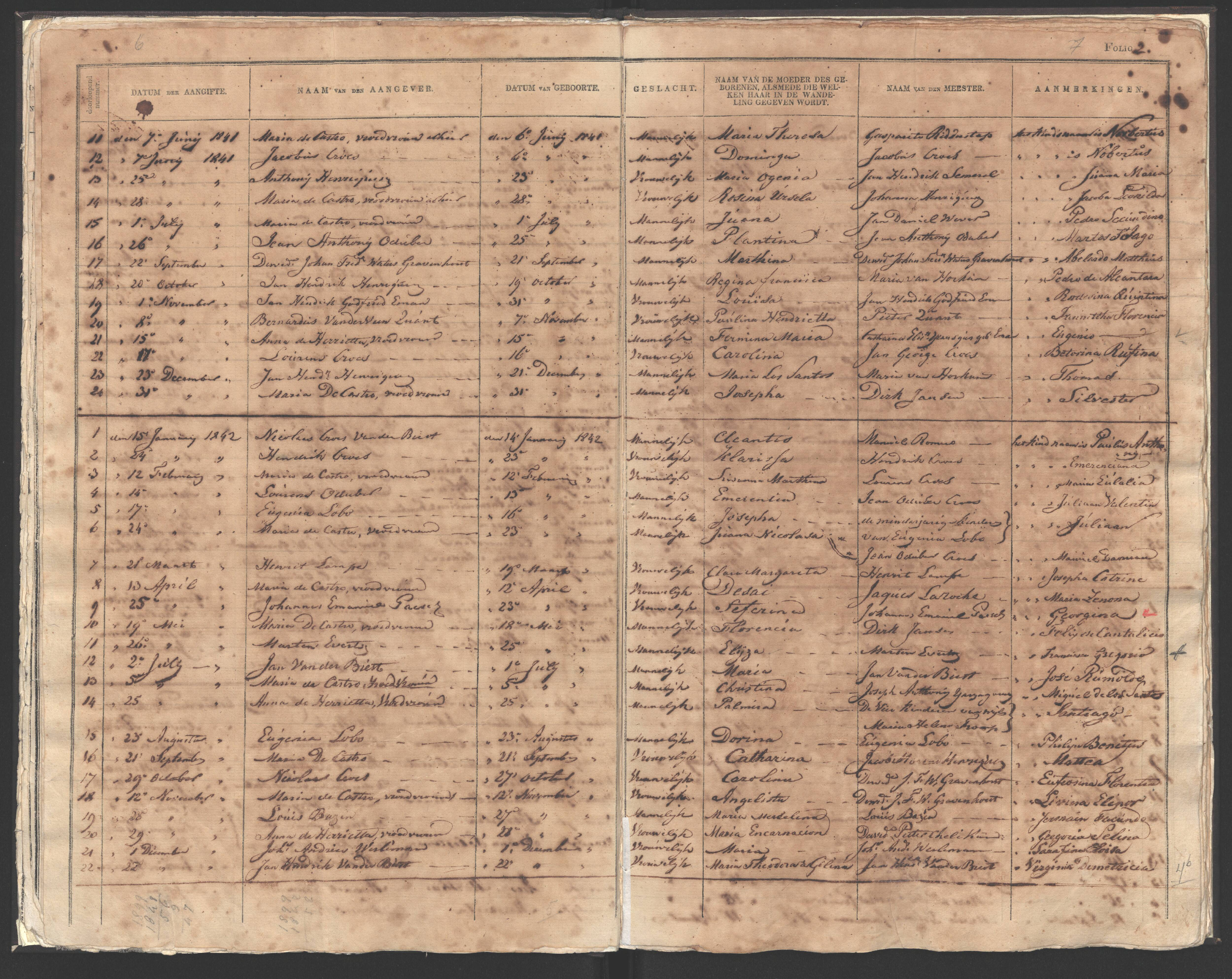
- Birth registry of Virginia Demetricia (entry nr. 22, 1842)
- Born: December 22, 1842; Aruba
- Died: After 1867
- Other names: Virginia Demetricia Gaai
- Known for: Heroine of resistance against slavery
- Criminal charges: Theft (two times, 1859); Attempt to escape and false accusations accompanied by disrespectful behavior (1860); Disturbing the peace on the street and resisting police (1860); Physical violence (Curaçao, 1861)
- Criminal penalty: Forced labor on public roads (14 days, 1859); Forced labor on Barbolia plantation (2 months + 4 weeks, 1859); Imprisonment at Fort Zoutman (8 days, 1860); Fourteen lashes with a whip (1860); Imprisonment (4 days, 1861)
- Children: 2
- Parents: Unknown (father); Maria Theodora (a) Gilina (mother)

Virginia Demetricia (Aruba, December 22, 1842 - after 1867) was an Aruban woman who rebelled against slavery. She was born enslaved on a plantation in Aruba and, due to her rebellious nature, she repeatedly came into contact with the authorities. Today, she is regarded as a heroine of resistance.

== Biography ==
=== Background ===
She was born on a modest plantation named Barbolia (nowadays, San Barbola). Her mother was a slave named Maria Theodora (a) Gilina. Virginia was the fourth child among her seven siblings. The identity of her father is unknown. Virginia started helping on the plantation when she was young, doing things like carrying messages and going to the market. Virginia, her mother, and her brothers and sisters all belonged to Jan Hendrik van der Biest, who was a Protestant colonist and assistant administrator in Aruba.

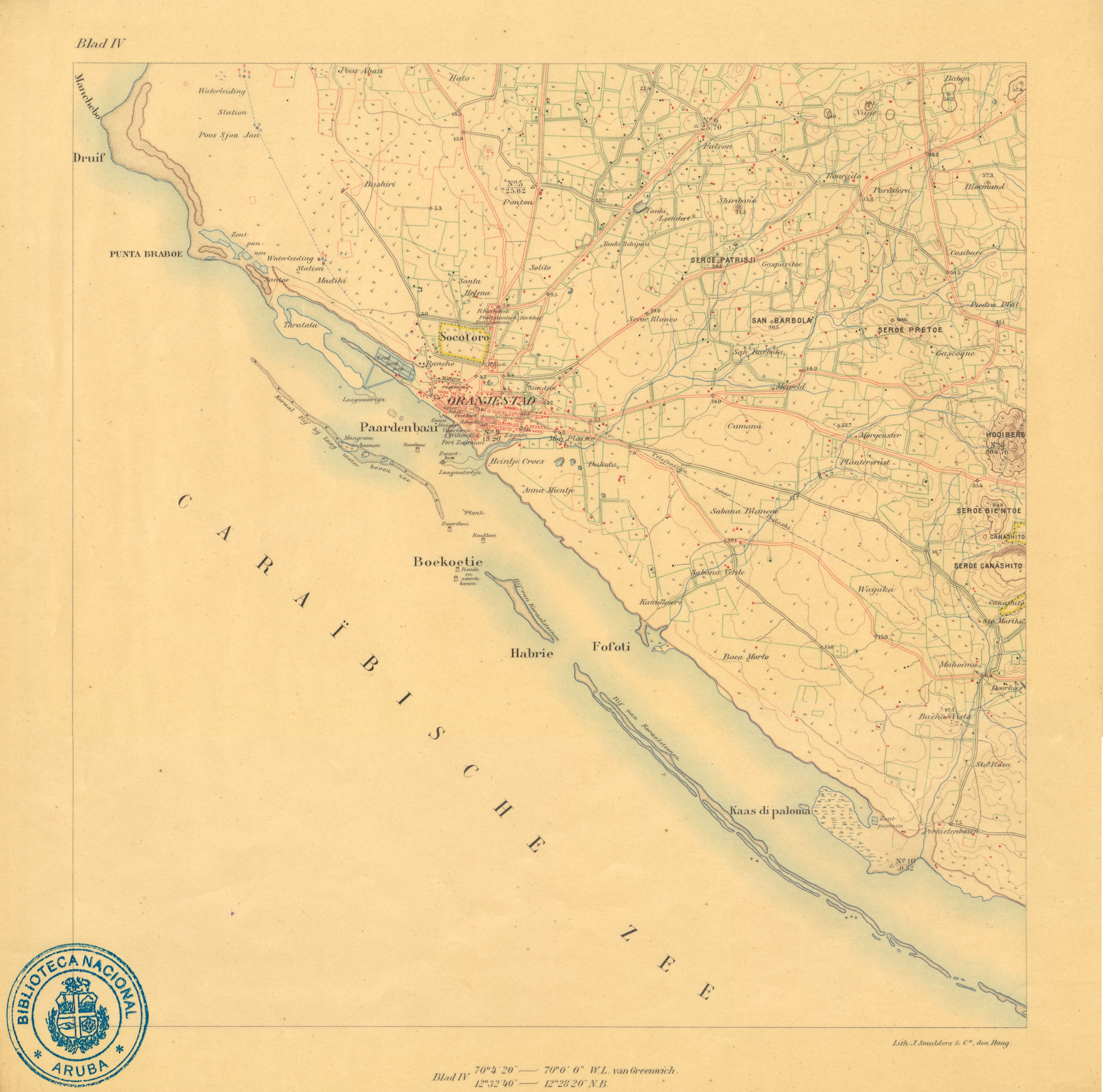
San Barbola plantation located northeast of Oranjestad (1912)

=== Virginia's rebellious acts ===
The introduction of the Slave Regulations of 1857 led to unrest in Suriname, but also on the islands of Curaçao and Aruba. Masters felt that their property rights were curtailed and that they should treat their slaves more carefully than their own children. The enslaved used the restraint of corporal punishment for refusal to work and disobedience, following the implementation of the new Regulations.

As a teenager, Virginia repeatedly broke the law. Between 1859 and 1863, five trials were conducted against her for violating the Regulations. Virginia resisted being controlled and rebelled against her enslaver, Van der Biest. Her first punishment for breaking the rules happened in March 1859 when she stole clothes from her mistress. As a result, the authorities on the island punished her with fourteen days of forced labor on the public road. Four months later, she broke the rules again and was punished with two months of forced labor in the plantation fields where she lived.

==== Escape attempts and further incidents ====
In November of the same year, she tried to escape the harsh conditions of the plantation but was unsuccessful. Her failed attempt led to an additional four weeks of work on the plantation. In July 1860, she was accused and found guilty of 'running away and making false accusations, accompanied by disrespectful behavior'. She was confined to a cell in Fort Zoutman for eight days. After her release, she was promptly arrested once more, this time for 'disturbing the peace on the street and resisting the police'. Since imprisonment and forced labor didn't seem to deter her, she received her first and only physical punishment: fourteen lashes with a whip.

=== Transition and emancipation ===
When the relationship between an owner and a slave became unsustainable, it was customary for the owner to sell the slave. On November 22, 1860, Virginia was sold and to be transported to her new owner, Jacob Abraham Jesurun, in Curaçao. Historical records show that he paid ƒ140 (Dutch guilders) for her. Virginia also had run-ins with the authorities in Curaçao. On June 10, 1861, she was apprehended by two police officers for being involved in a case of 'simple physical violence,' leading to a four-day imprisonment. On June 17, 1862, Virginia welcomed her first child, a daughter named Jeanette.

==== After emancipation ====
In 1863, Virginia's life took a different trajectory with the abolition of slavery. Jesurun received ƒ200 as compensation for her. From then on, Virginia adopted the surname "Gaai". Her relatives in Aruba adopted the surname "Bikker," and her daughter Jeanette took on the name "Daña".

==== Last information ====
The last documented information about Virginia is that she gave birth to a son named Marcelino Martis Gaai in Willemstad on June 2, 1867.

== Sources ==
- Alofs, L. (2013). "Virginia Dementricia Gaai". Slaven zonder plantage : (kinder-)slavernij en emancipatie op Aruba [Slaves Without Plantation: (Child) Slavery and Emancipation in Aruba] (in Dutch). Charuba. ISBN 978-99904-1-779-1.
