= Numismatic Museum of Aruba =

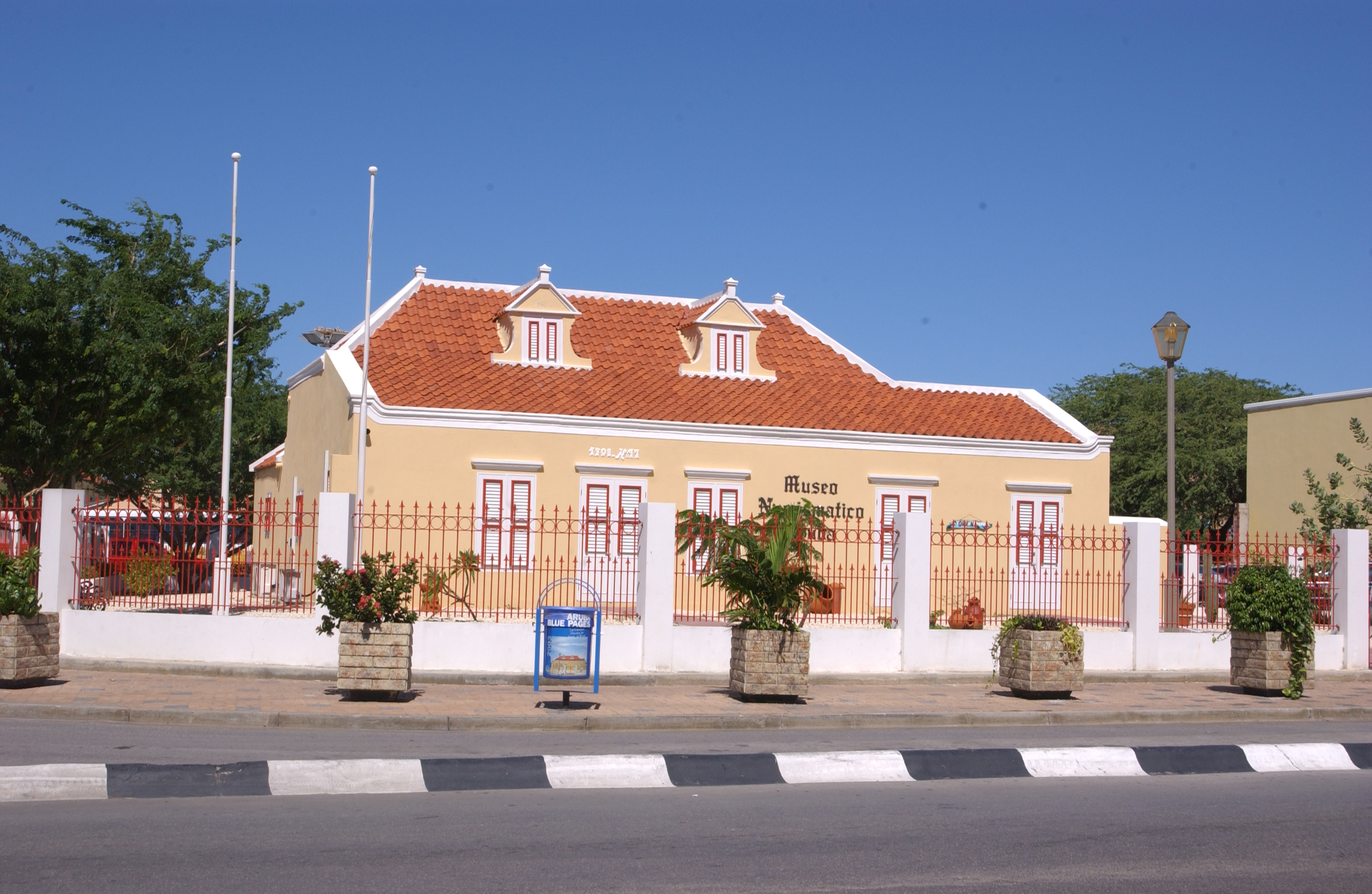
- Museum building in 2004

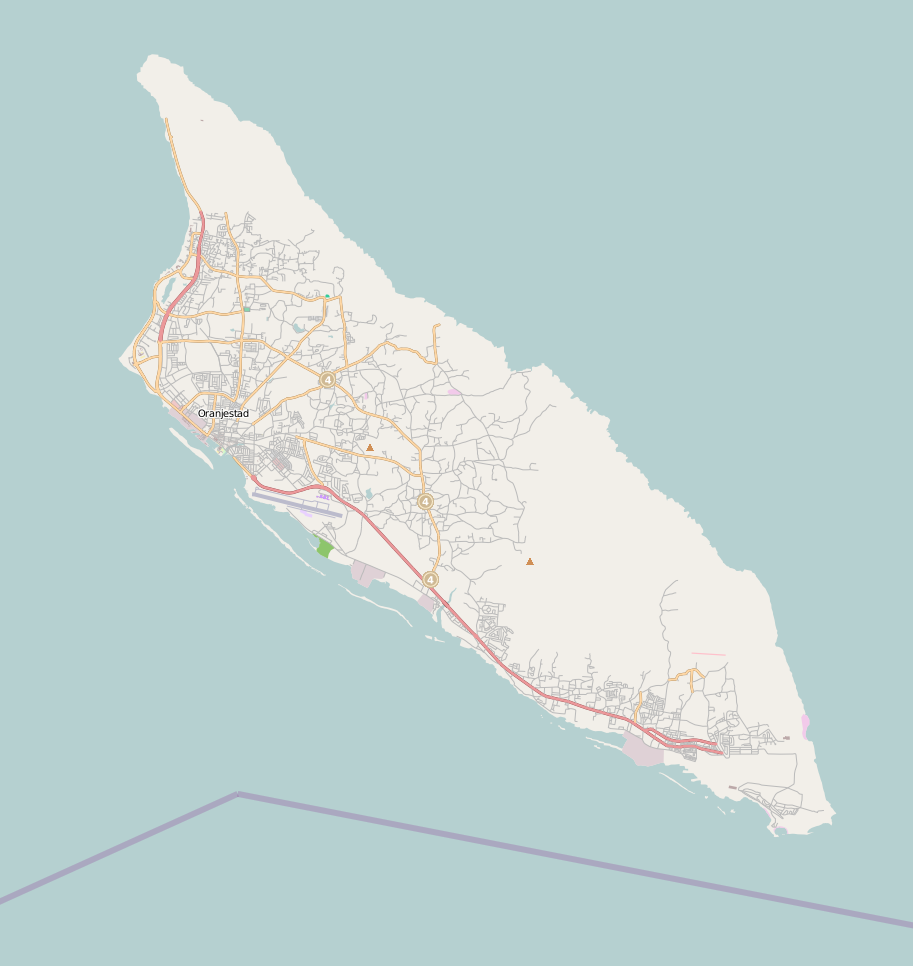
- Location in Aruba
- Established: 13 November 1981
- Location: The Yellow House; Weststraat 15; Oranjestad, Aruba
- Coordinates: 12.5209°N 70.0398°W
- Type: Numismatic museum
- Founder: J. Mario Odor

The Numismatic Museum of Aruba (Papiamento: Museo Numismatico Aruba) is a former numismatic museum in the city of Oranjestad in Aruba. It was founded by J. Mario Odor and was opened on 13 November 1981. The collections included coins, paper money, and stamps of Aruba and other countries. The museum is now closed.

== See also ==
- List of museums in Aruba
