= Museum of Antiquities Aruba =

Museum in Aruba

- Museo di Antiguedad Aruba
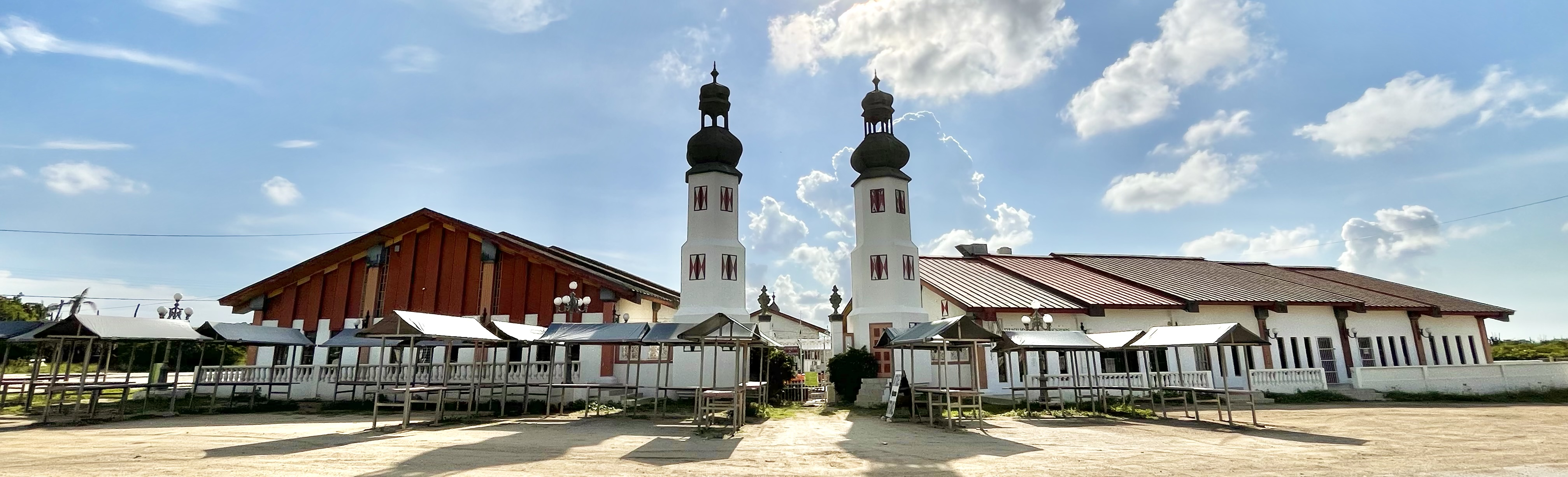

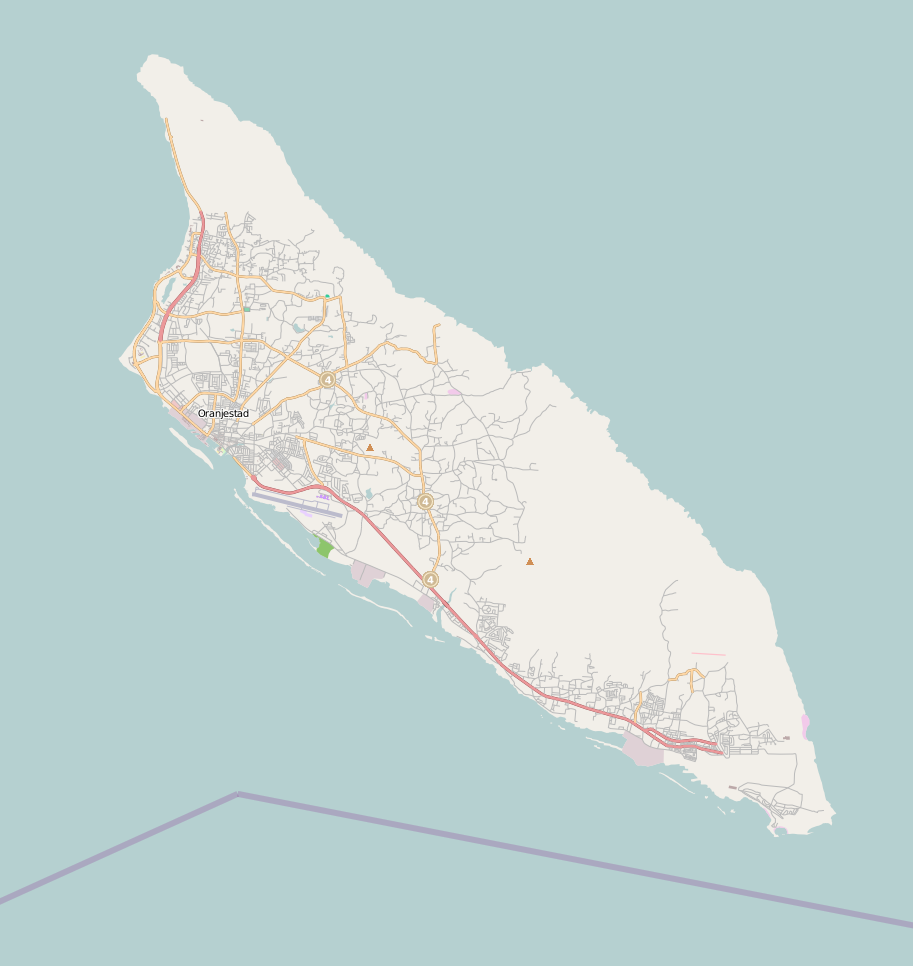
- Location in Aruba
- Location: Rococo Plaza; Tanki Leendert 158-G; Paradera, Aruba
- Coordinates: 12.5384°N 70.0136°W

The Museum of Antiquities Aruba (Papiamento: Museo di Antiguedad Aruba) is a museum in Paradera in the outskirts of Oranjestad in Aruba. The museum covers from the preceramic era to the 20th century.

== See also ==
- List of museums in Aruba
