= Royal Aruba Aloe =

Aloe production company (1890–)

Aloe Museum
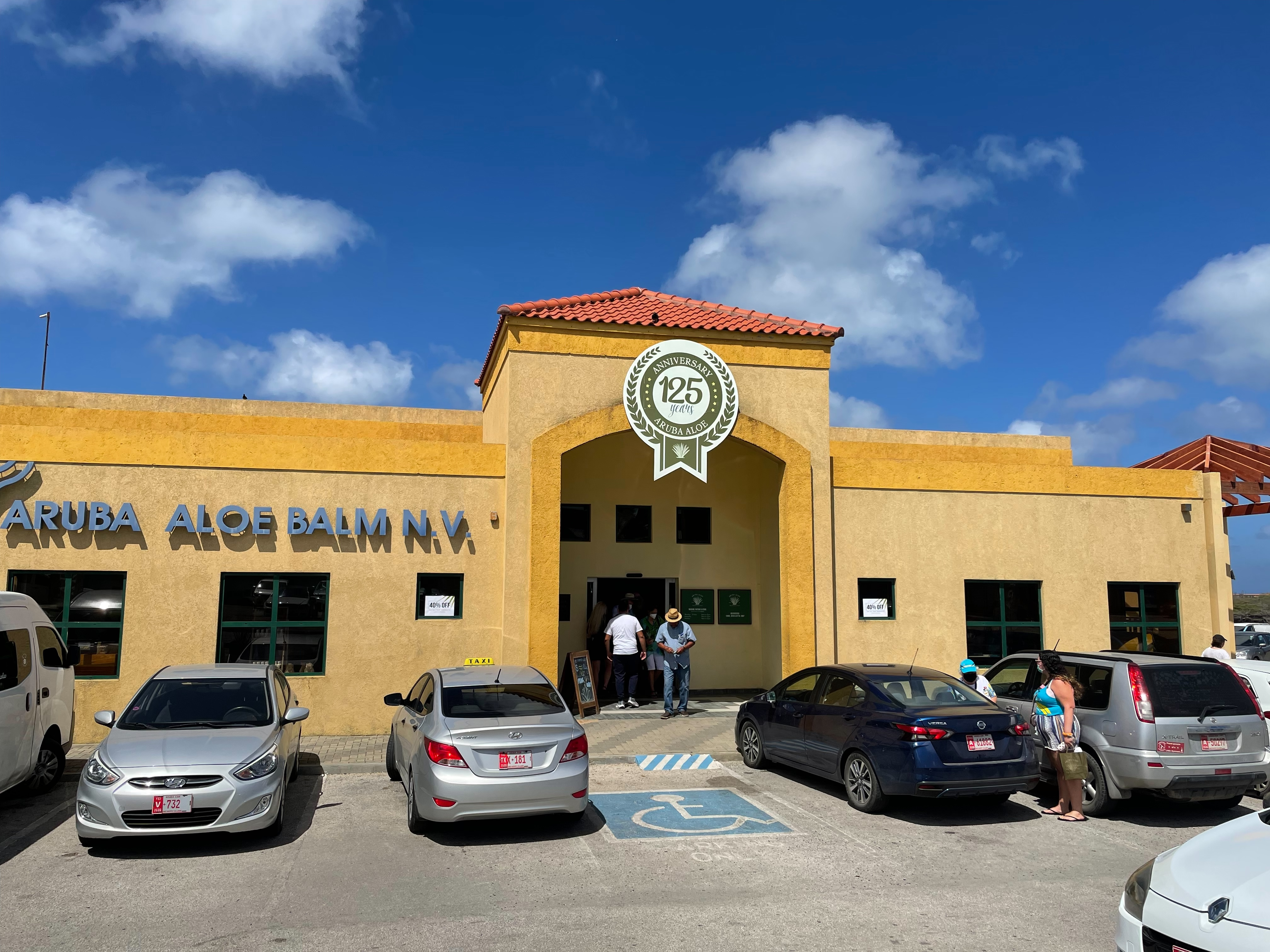

- Location within Aruba
- Established: 1890
- Location: Pitastraat 115, Hato, Oranjestad, Aruba
- Coordinates: 12.5411°N 70.0375°W
- Website: arubaaloe.com

Royal Aruba Aloe was founded in 1890 by Cornelis Eman, and is a company in which cultivates and produces aloe derived products in Aruba, in the Dutch Caribbean. The company is still owned by the Eman family. They also own a museum showing the methods of aloe vera production and processing.

== Background ==
The company grows, harvests, and processes all of their aloe products on the same site, and is one of the few aloe companies in the world to do so. In addition, it is one of the oldest aloe companies in the world, and one of the oldest companies in Aruba.

As of 2023, the company employs around 150 people, with its products being exported to 55 countries, including selling 15,000 units per year in the United States.

In 2021, the company became the first outside the Netherlands to be awarded with a Royal Predicate (Koninklijk), in honour of its history of over 100 years of business.

== Museum ==
The company also owns a museum, based in Hato, Aruba. The location also hosts the company’s first physical store, which opened in 2000, next to Cornelis Eman’s original aloe field. This is one of 19 stores across the island.The museum hosts free tours in Spanish, English, Dutch, and the local language of Papiamento. The tour teaches visitors about the history of aloe manufacturing, about how aloe is cut, packed, tested, prepared and stored. Visitors are able to see into the plant and see the preparation process taking place, providing insight into a production process with over 170 years of history on the island.

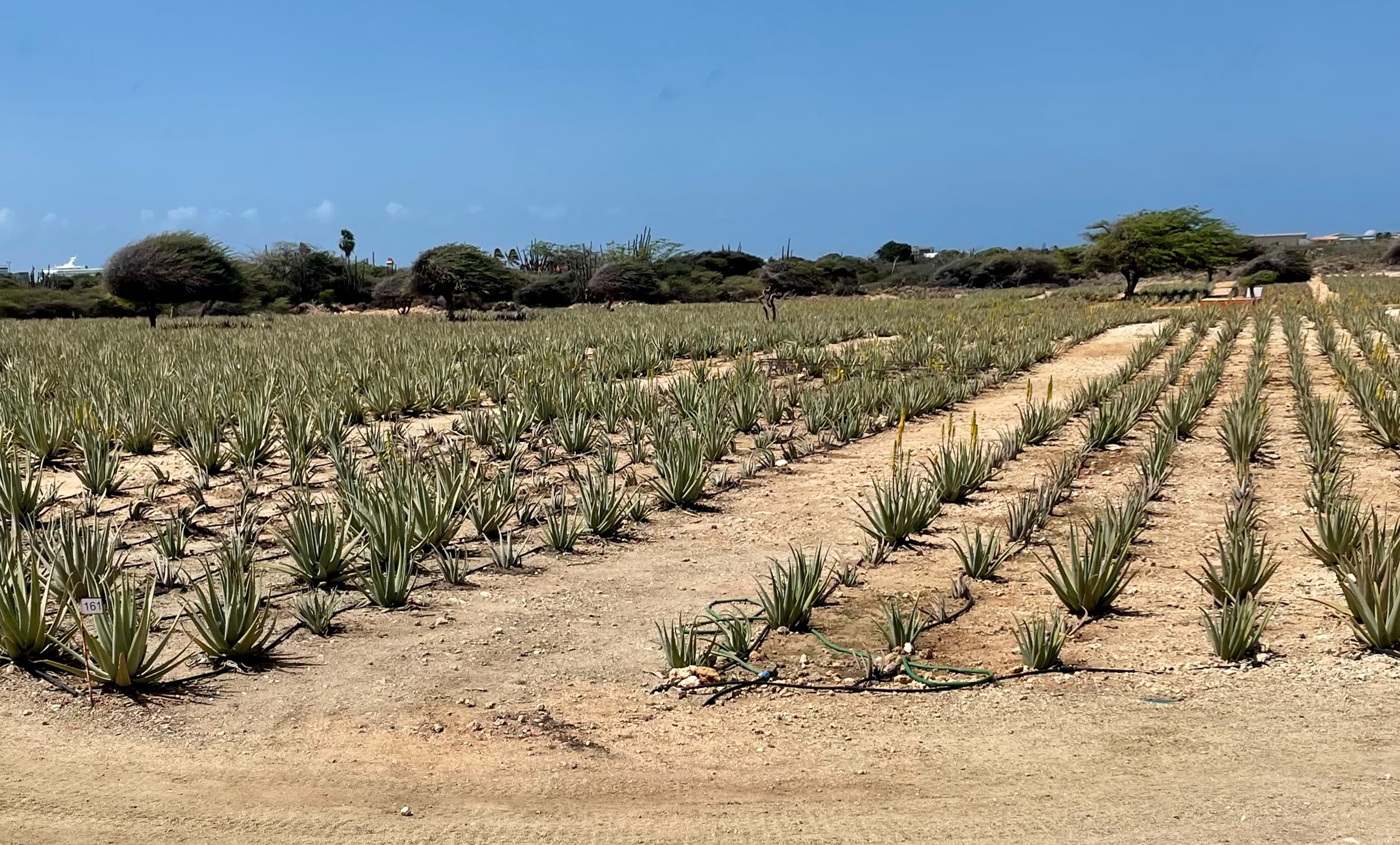
Aloe Vera plantation at the Aruba Aloe Factory and Museum in Hato

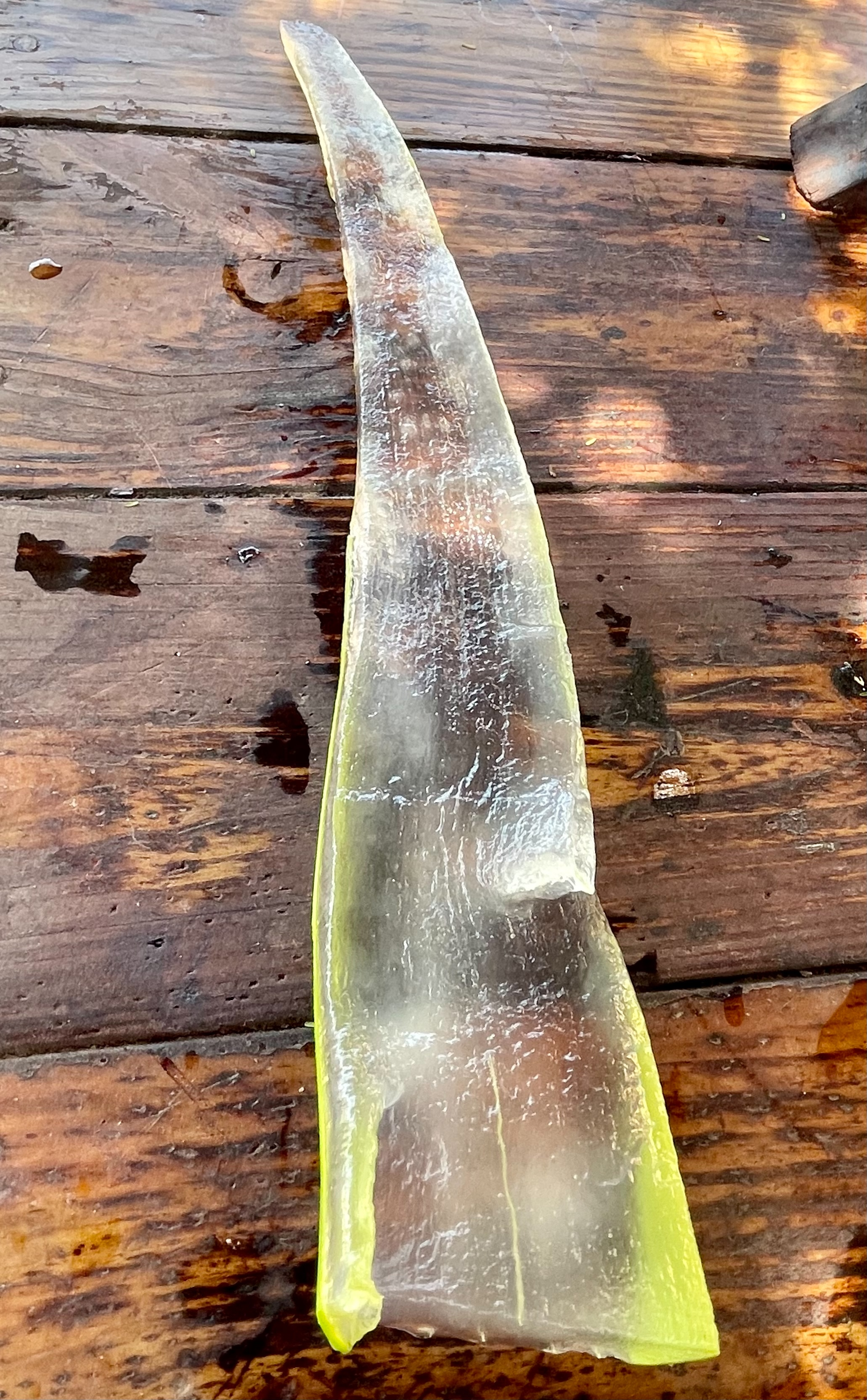
Gel removed from aloe Vera leaf

== See also ==
- List of museums in Aruba
