= Sports Museum of Aruba =

Museum in Aruba

Coordinates: 12.566588°N 70.011305°W

The Sports Museum of Aruba is a museum located in Aruba about the achievements of Aruban athletes. It is dedicated to Francisco Chirino.

== See also ==
- List of museums in Aruba
