= Vince Irie =

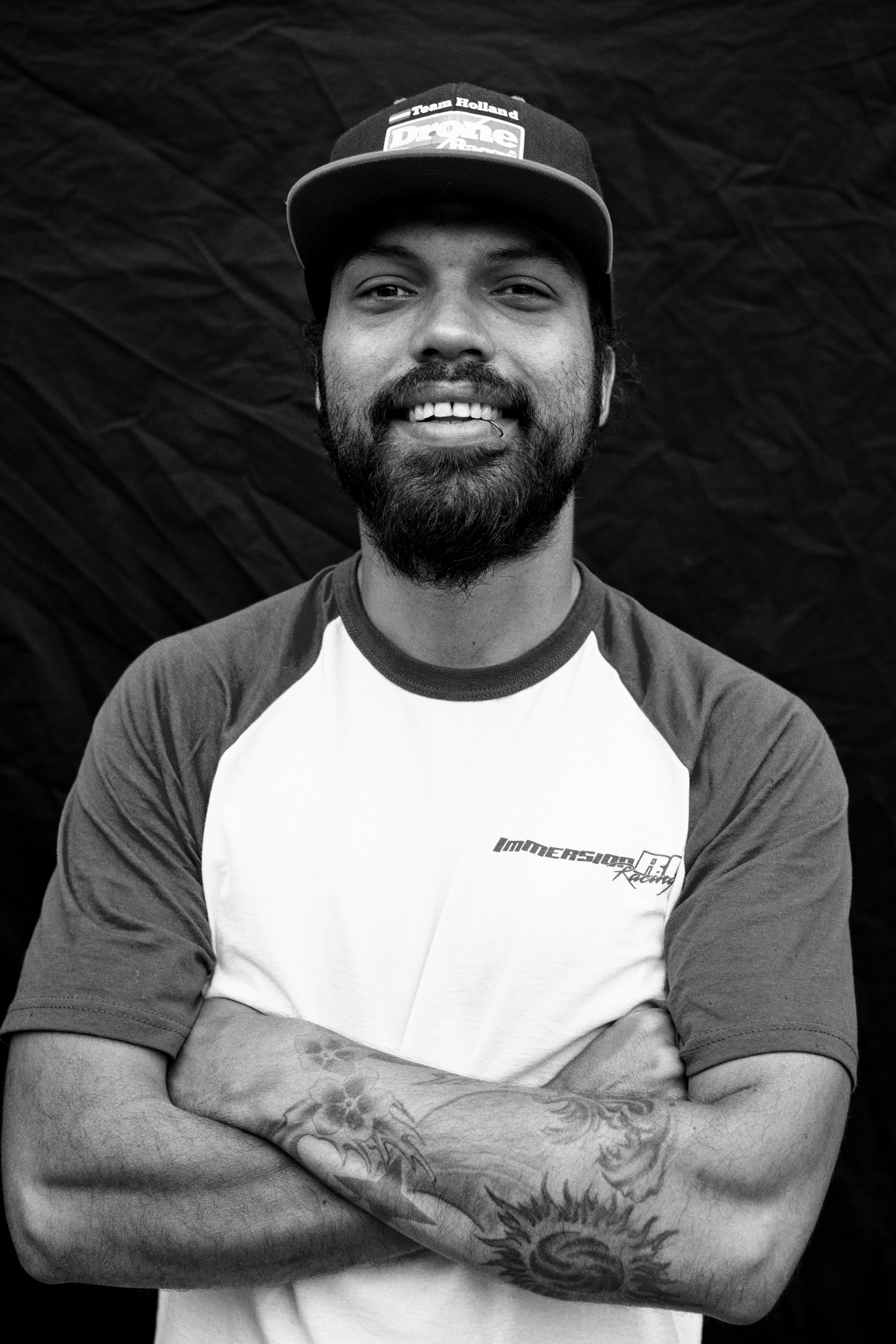

Background information
- Born: 30 July 1987 (age 38); Oranjestad, Aruba
- Origin: Aruba
- Genres: Reggae; Pop; Alternative Rock
- Occupation: Singer-songwriter
- Years active: 2009–present
- Website: vinceirie.com

Vince Irie is a singer-songwriter born and raised on Aruba. Vince Irie gained notoriety in The Netherlands when he appeared on the 4th season of The Voice of Holland in 2014. Since then he has released the singles Ik Wil Jou, Prachtig, Unfaithful and Take It Easy

Vince has also been an active member of the FPV Drone racing community, participating in international races like DRL and DR1.
