= Tanki Leendert =

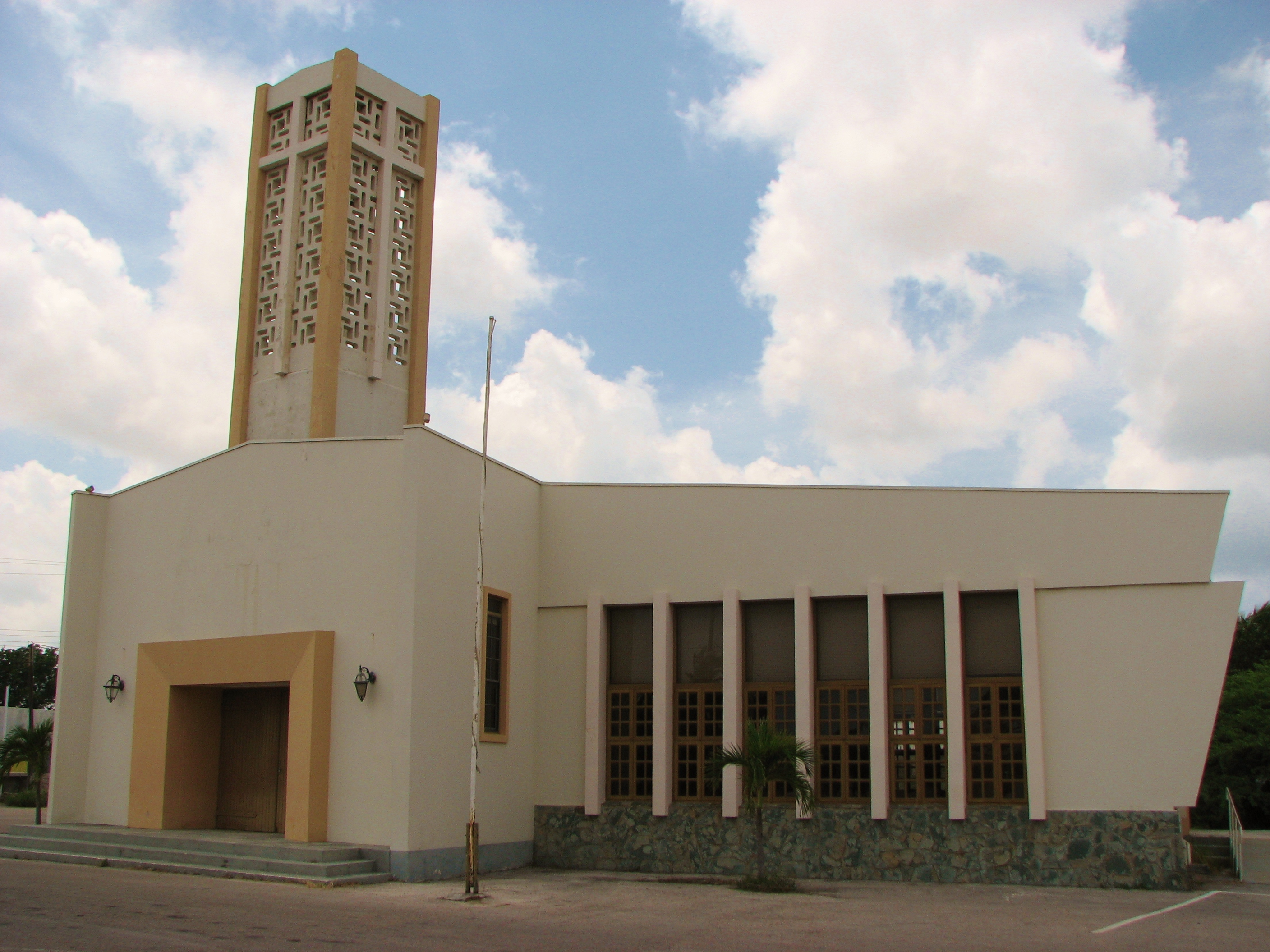
- Monte Calvario Church in Tanki Leender

- Location in Aruba
- Coordinates: 12.54160°N 70.01989°W
- State: Kingdom of the Netherlands
- Country: Aruba
- Region: Noord

Population (2010)
  - Total: 3,811

Tanki Leendert is a town in Noord on the island of Aruba. The parish of Tanki Leendert has been split from Noord since 1968.

== History ==
Tanki is Papiamento for "pond", and Leendert is a common surname. An Amerindian village has been discovered near the town measuring 450 by 400 metres. It is one of the four known Amerindian settlements on Aruba. European pottery, pipes and bottles from the 18th century have also been discovered on the same site, suggesting a later resettlement.

In the 20th century, Noord became the centre for the tourism industry and site of large scale hotel construction which has resulted in Tanki Leendert, Noord, Paradera and Tanki Flip merging into a near continuous urban area. In 1968, the parish of Tanki Leendert was split of Noord, and the Monte Calvario Church was inaugurated. The Museum of Antiquities Aruba is located in Tanki Leendert.

== Sports ==
The local football team is SV Juventud Tanki Leendert who play in the Aruban Division Uno.
