= Model Trains Museum =

Private museum in Aruba

- Established: 1 December 2001; 24 years ago
- Location: Koolbaaibergstraat 12; San Nicolaas, Aruba
- Coordinates: 12°26′4.4″N 69°53′20.31″W
- Director: J. de Vries

The Model Trains Museum is a private museum in the town of San Nicolaas in Aruba. It covers the history of train traffic from 1875 to the present. The museum is on the ground floor of a private residence, and includes model trains from England, Germany, the U.S., and Canada, and a number of model planes and automobiles as well.

The museum's collection was initially started by the Dutch Mr. de Vries who had collected model trains his whole life.

== See also ==
- List of museums in Aruba
