= Protestant Church (Aruba) =

Church in Oranjestad, Aruba

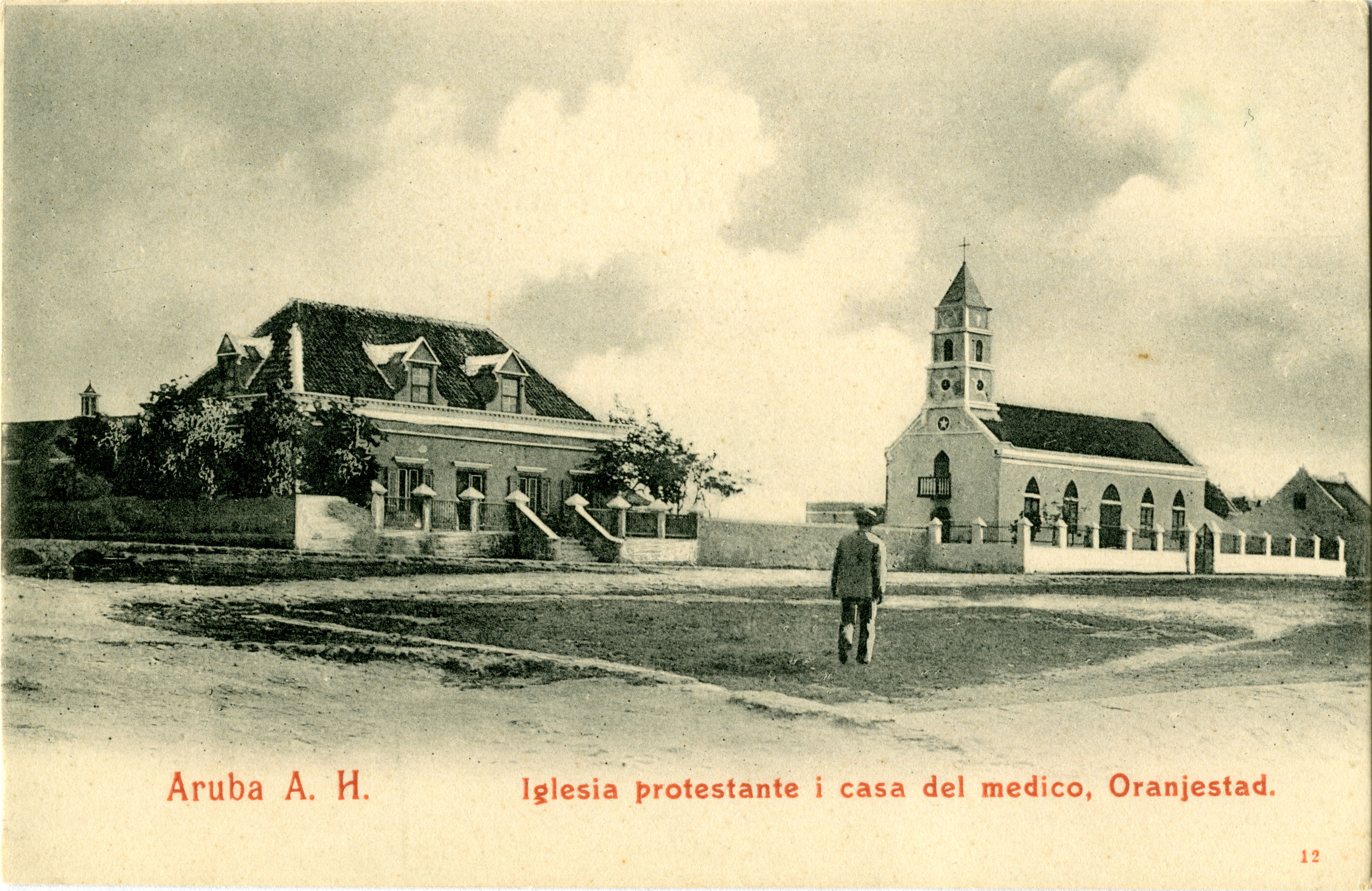
- Old Protestant Church and Doctor's House (1903)

- Location within Aruba

Religion
- Affiliation: Dutch Reformed and Lutheranism
- Year consecrated: 15 February 1846

Location
- Location: Oranjestad, Aruba
- Interactive map of Protestant Church
- Coordinates: 12.51928°N 70.03661°W

Architecture
- Groundbreaking: 1845

Website
- https://protestantsekerkaruba.com

The Protestant Church is a church of the Dutch Reformed and Lutheran community in Oranjestad, Aruba. The church is not an official member of any international church organisation. The old church dates from 1846. In 1950, a new church was constructed next to the old church. The old church is the second oldest building of Oranjestad which still exists after Fort Zoutman.

== History ==
The majority of the population of Aruba were Roman Catholics, and there used to be no church for the island’s Protestant community. There was a gentlemen's agreement that Catholic priests would perform baptisms and other rites, and inform the Lutheran or Dutch Reformed community in Curaçao. The Protestant community petitioned the States General of the Netherlands to open a church in Aruba.

In 1822, Karel van Eekhout was sent to Aruba as minister and schoolteacher. J.H.G. Eman was appointed as overseer for the Lutheran Church, and C. Specht for the Dutch Reformed Church. Together, they purchased the house of the Arends family in 1822 and on 25 August, the first service was held. The church services were held in Papiamento. Van Eekhout had no formal education, and therefore was not allowed to administer the sacraments. In 1830, he resigned, and it wasn't until 1839 when an ordained minister was appointed.

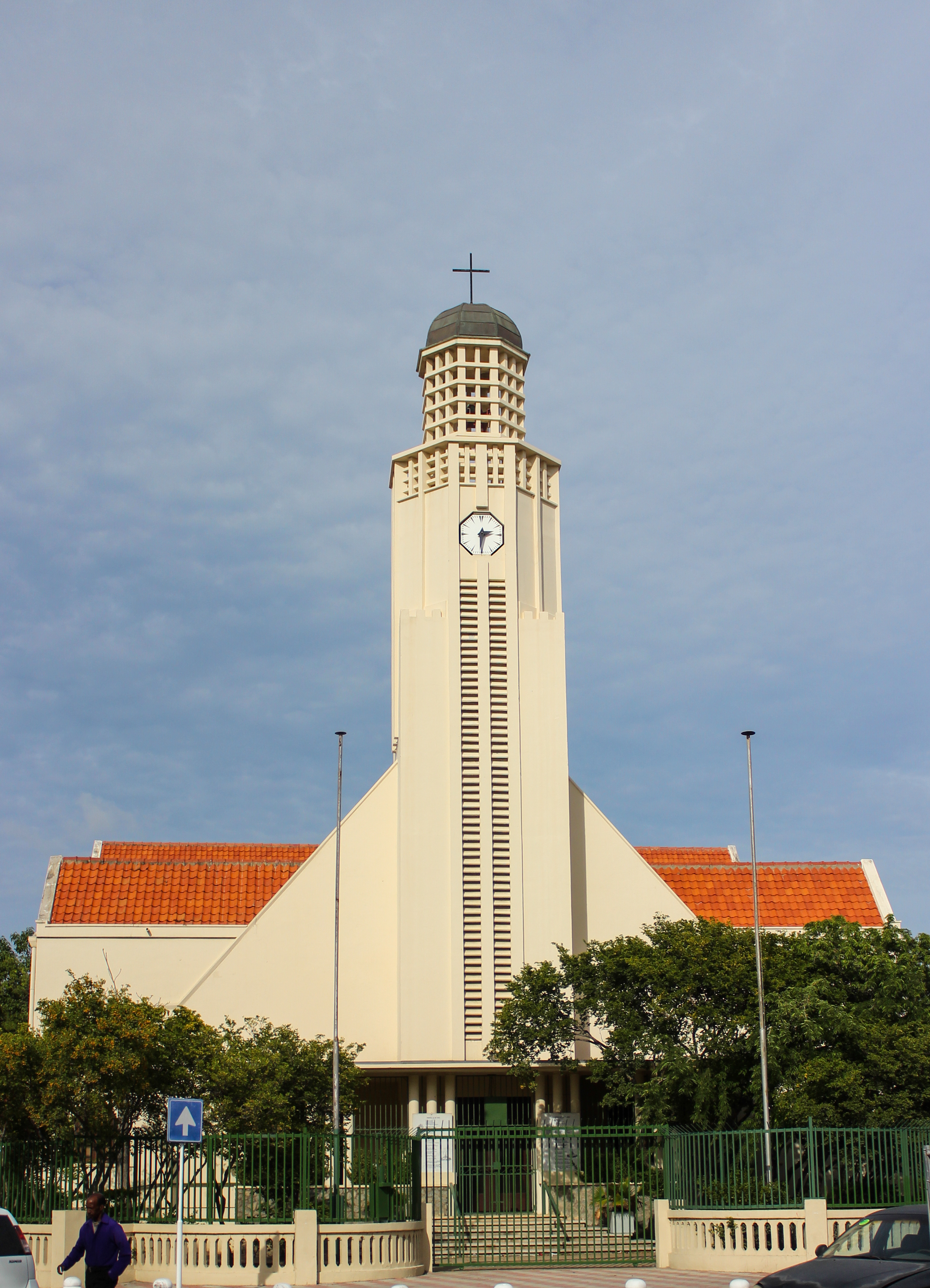
New Protestant Church

The house was too small and in a poor condition, so in 1845 it was demolished, and a real church was constructed in its place. The congregation at the time was about 400 people. In 1867, a tower was added to the church.

In 1950, a new church was built next to the old church on the grounds of the former Doctor's House. The new church was inaugurated on 28 May 1950. and was designed by C.M. Bakker. In 2011, the congregation was 480 people, with services are still held in Papiamento.

In 1988, the old church was restored and is currently in use as exhibition and concert hall. It also houses the A. van den Doel Bible Museum.

== A. van den Doel Bible Museum ==
The A. van den Doel Bible Museum is housed in the Old Protestant Church. The collections include old bibles, works of art, and other religious artifacts. It is named after Anthonie van den Doel who was minister of the church from 1983 until 2001.

== Bibliography ==
- National Archives of Aruba (2012). "Archieven van de protestantse gemeente van Aruba 1822-2008" (PDF) (in Dutch).
