= List of museums in Aruba =

This is a list of museums in Aruba.

== Museums ==
- A. van den Doel Bible Museum
- Aloe Museum
- Community Museum
- Historical Museum of Aruba
- Industry Museum of Aruba
- Model Trains Museum
- Museum of Antiquities Aruba
- National Archaeological Museum Aruba
- De Olde Molen
- Nicolaas Store
- Sports Museum of Aruba

== Defunct museums ==
- Numismatic Museum of Aruba

== See also ==
- List of museums by country
