= Fort Zoutman =

- Oranjestad, Aruba
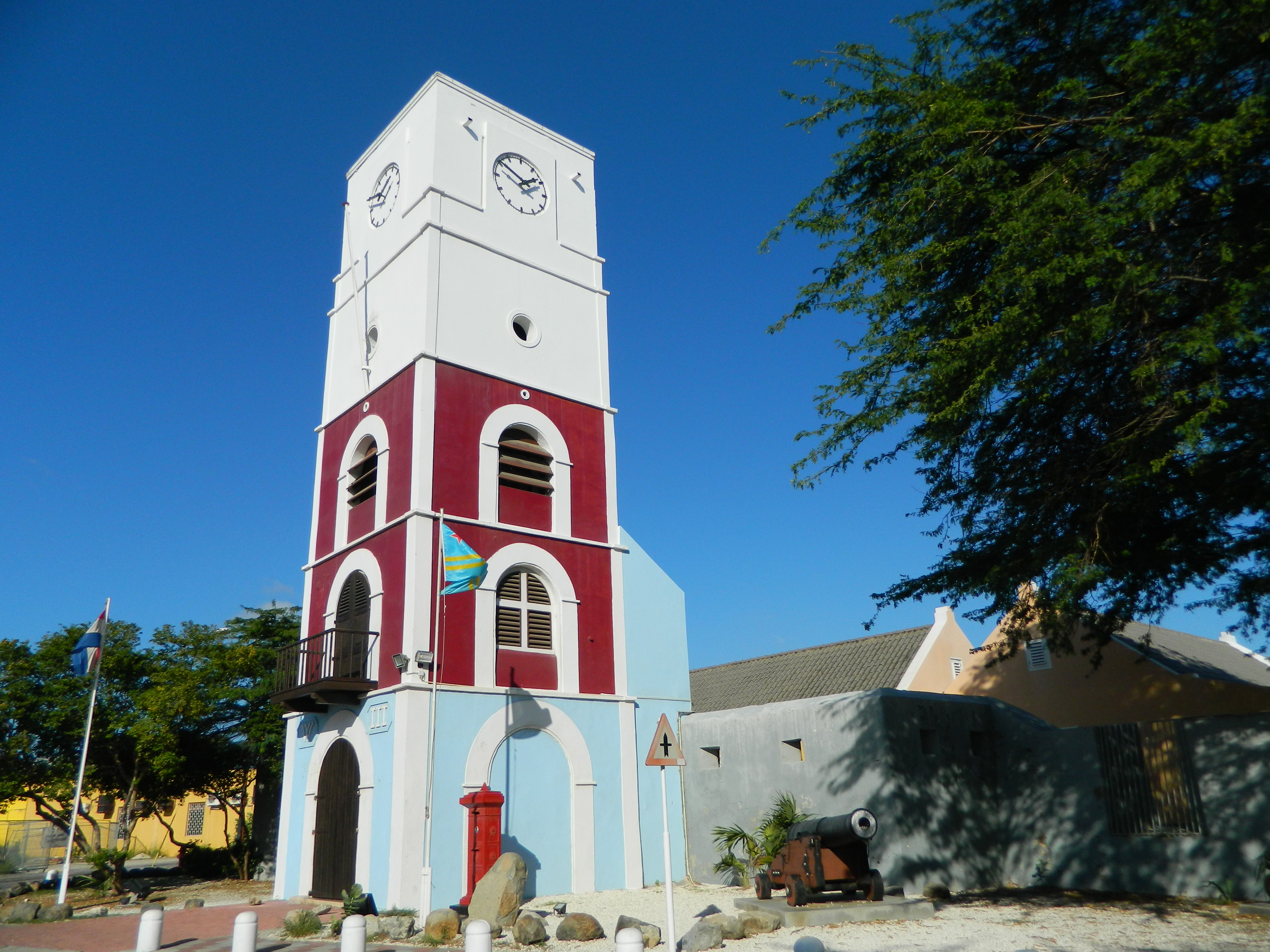
- Willem III Tower at the west entrance of the fort

Site information
- Type: Fortification
- Owner: Aruba
- Controlled by: Fundacion Museo Arubano
- Open to the public: Yes
- Condition: Restored tourist attraction and museum

Location
- Location within Aruba Fort Zoutman (the Caribbean)
- Coordinates: 12.5178°N 70.0357°W

Site history
- Built: 1796-1798 (fort); 1866-1868 (tower)
- Built by: Johann Rudolf Lauffer, acting governor (fort); J.H. Ferguson, lieutenant governor (tower)
- Materials: Stone, concrete coral

Fort Zoutman (Dutch pronunciation: [fɔrt ˈsʌutmɑn]) (Note: In isolation, Zoutman is pronounced [ˈzʌutmɑn].) is a military fortification at Oranjestad, Aruba. Originally built in 1798 by African slaves, with materials provided by the Amerindians, who performed Statute Labour or corvée for the Dutch West India Company, it is the oldest structure on the island of Aruba, one of the main tourist attractions on the island, and regarded by UNESCO as a 'Place of Memory of the Slave Trade Route in the Latin Caribbean'. The Willem III Tower was added to the west side of the fort in 1868. The fort and tower were restored and re-opened in 1983 as the Historical Museum of Aruba.

== History ==
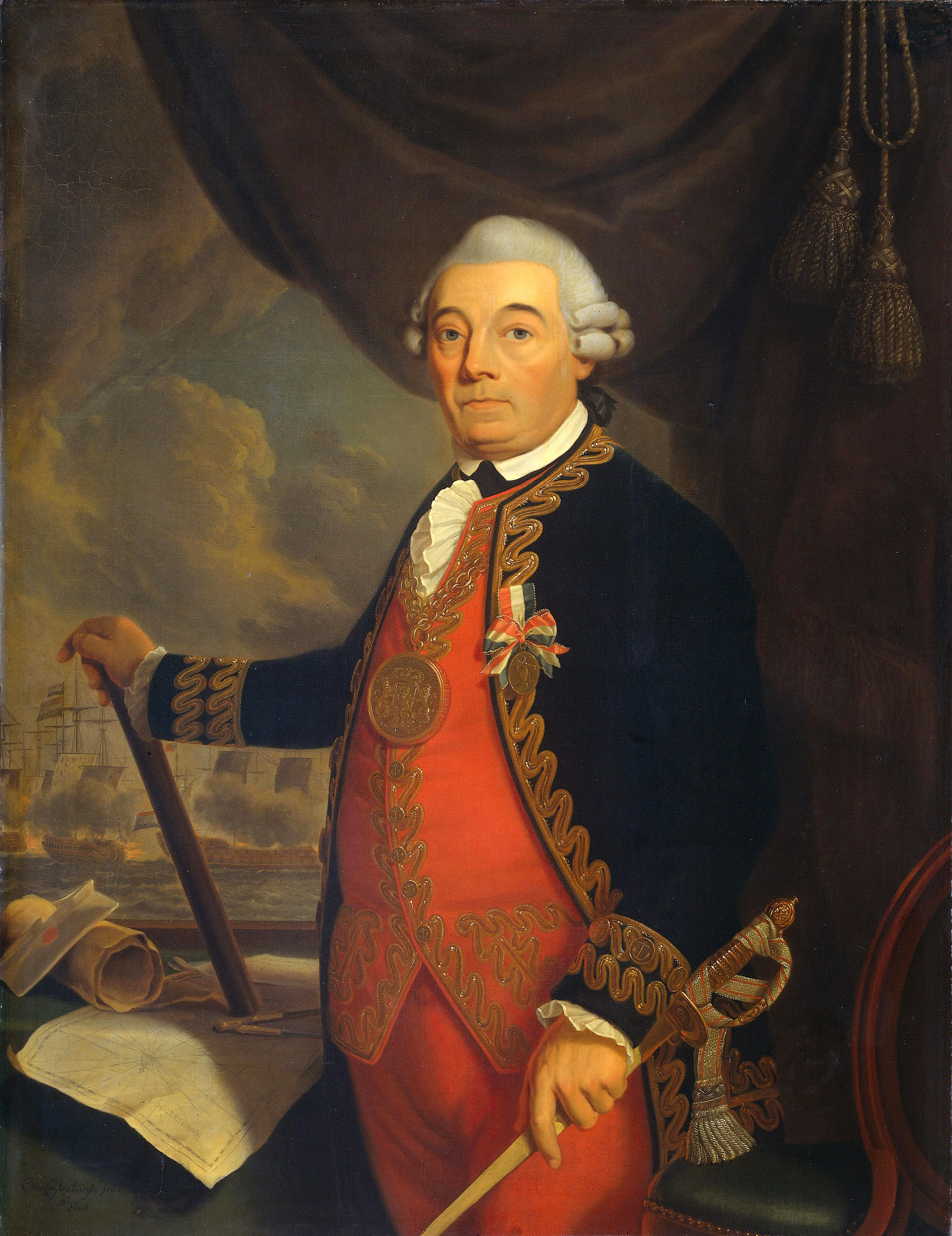
Johan Zoutman

The Dutch first settled Paardenbaai (English: Bay of Horses) on the island of Aruba as an intermediate harbor between Curaçao and Venezuela. In 1796, a Comité Militaire (English: Army Committee) was established in Curaçao under acting governor Johann Rudolf Lauffer to build fortifications on the islands of Aruba, Curaçao and Bonaire to defend against pirates and other enemies. The fort on Aruba was named after Dutch Rear Admiral Johan Arnold Zoutman who fought in the Fourth Anglo-Dutch War and the American Revolutionary War, though he had never been to the island. It was completed in 1798 at what was then the shoreline of the island, and was initially armed with four cannons. The surrounding area developed through economic growth into the capital city of Oranjestad.

Renovation of the fort began in 1826 under Commander Simon Plats who found it to be in poor shape. The fort was not garrisoned from 1830 to 1834. While occupied by a small colonial constabulary brigade in 1859, prison cells were constructed against the eastern and western walls, eliminating some of the embrasures and gun ports. The eastern cells were replaced with concrete units in 1936. The present day walls date back to 1936, and 31 of as many as 35 gun ports were counted in the walls prior to the fort's most recent restoration in 1974.

=== Willem III Tower ===
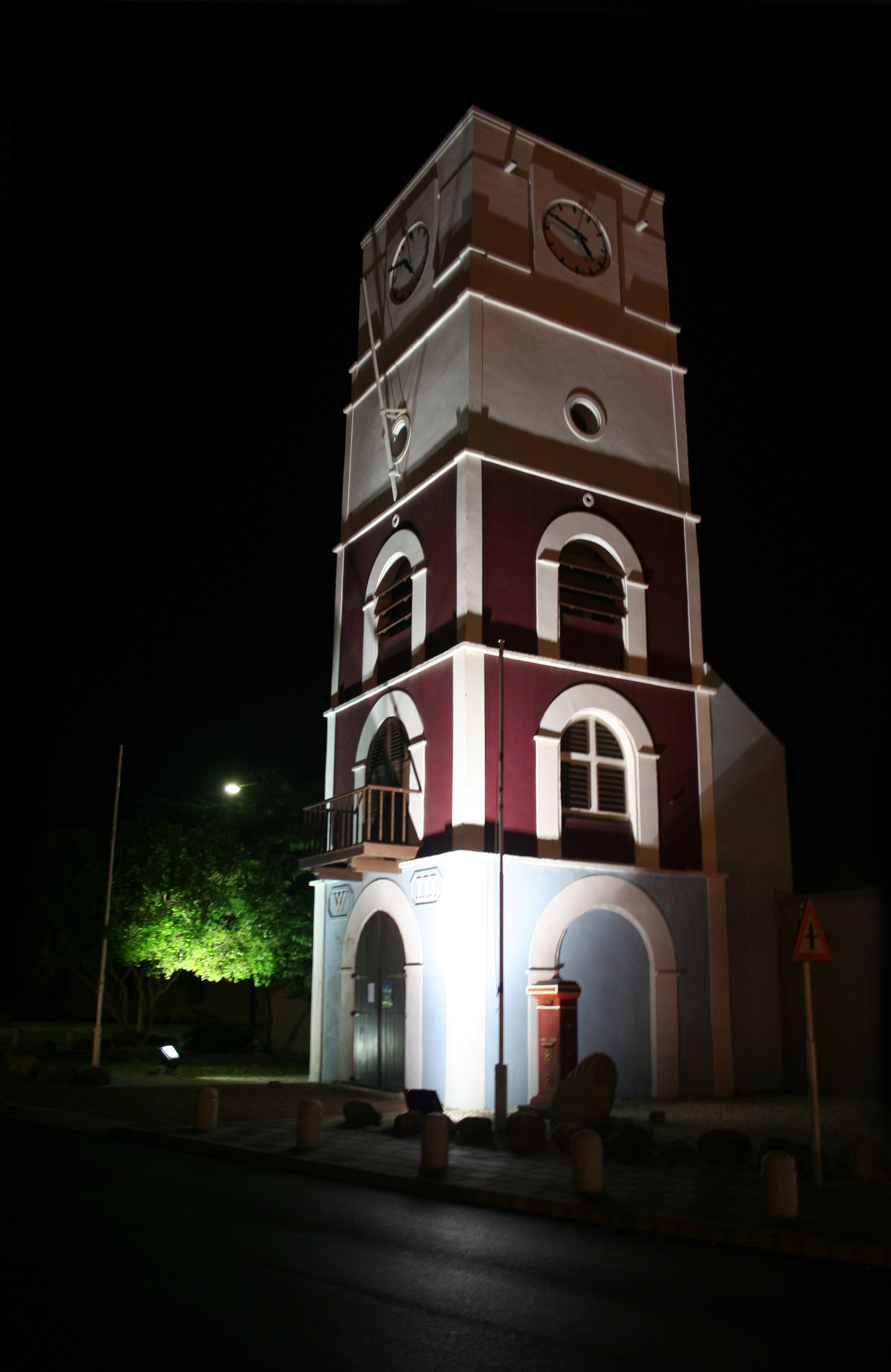
The tower at night

At the request of lieutenant governor J.H. Ferguson in 1866, construction began on a lighthouse at the fort which could also house the town bell to be rung on the hour. The completed Willem III Tower (Dutch: Willem III Toren) was named after King William III of the Netherlands and lighted on his birthday, 19 February 1868. Archways at its base were designed to serve as the west entrance to the fort. The original kerosene lamp was replaced by a petrol lamp and then an acetylene lamp in 1930. Electrical lighting was added in 1935. The tower ceased to function as a lighthouse in 1963 with the removal of its lamp. Over the years, it has also functioned as a clock tower, courtroom, library, post office, tax office, watchtower and a station for the Aruba Police Force.

=== Historical Museum of Aruba ===
The fort and tower underwent restoration work from 1974 to 1980. On 15 September 1983, the facility was re-opened as the Historical Museum of Aruba. The Fundacion Museo Arubano (English: Aruban Museum Foundation) has administered the museum since 16 March 1992. It is open to the public from 9:00 a.m. to 6:00 p.m. on weekdays and on Saturdays from 10:00 a.m. to 6:00 p.m. Exhibits cover the early history and development of Aruba during the beginning of the twentieth century. Group visits and walking city tours are accommodated by multilingual guides. The Bon Bini Festival is held at the fort every Tuesday at 7:00 p.m. to 8:30 p.m.

== See also ==
- History of Aruba
- Virginia Dementricia
