= Oranjestad =

Capital of Aruba

Oranjestad Playa (Papiamento)
- Capital city
- Clockwise: Townhall, I Love Aruba sign, Royal Plaza, Plaza Simon Bolivar, Plaza Betico Croes, Tram in center of the town, Census Building, Plaza Daniel Leo, Willem III tower. Center clockwise: Wilhelmina Park, Archeological Museum, Ecury House, Protestant church, Aruban Courthouse, San Francisco church
- Etymology: Orange Town
- Nickname: Playa
- Motto: One Happy Island
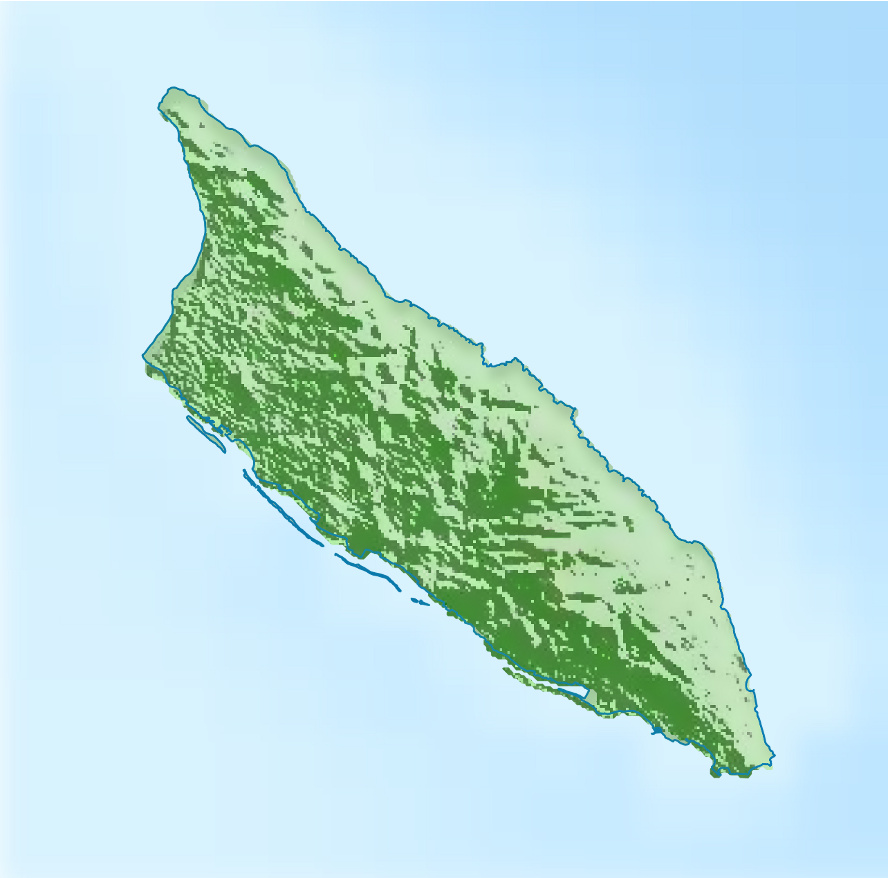
- Location within Aruba Location within North America
- Coordinates: 12°31′07″N 70°02′09″W
- Sovereign state: Kingdom of the Netherlands
- Country: Aruba
- Regions: Oranjestad West; Oranjestad East
- Founded: c. 1796; 230 years ago

Area
  - Total: 23 km^{2} (8.9 sq mi)
- Elevation: 4 m (13 ft)

Population (2020)
  - Total: 28,658
  - Rank: 1st
  - Density: 2,522/km^{2} (6,530/sq mi)
- Time zone: UTC−04:00 (AST)
- Climate: BSh

Oranjestad (UK: /ɒˈrænjəstɑːt/ orr-AN-yə-staht, US: /ɔːˈrɑːn-, oʊˈrɑːn-/ or-AHN-, oh-RAHN-, Dutch: [oːˈrɑɲəstɑt]; literally "Orange City" in Dutch; Papiamento: Playa, lit. 'beach'), the capital and most populous of Aruba's eight regions, is located on the southwestern coast of the island.

Administratively, the Oranjestad is divided into two regions: East and West. In 2010, the capital had a population of 28,294, and by 2020, it increased to 28,658.

== History ==
Since 1754, European settlers established modest plantations along Aruba's south coast and the flat northwestern region, leading to the emergence of the first residential centers. In the early 20th century, the island was divided into four "districts": the first district, Playa, the second with Noord, the third with Santa Cruz, and the fourth with Sabaneta (Savaneta). By 1795 or 1796, (Note: Alofs and Merkies (2001) mentions 1795, whereas Bosch (1836) references 1796.) as Aruba opened up and trade restrictions eased, urban development commenced. Traders and craftsmen subsequently migrated to the village by the bay. Governor Johann Lauffer granted permission to settle at the bay and engage in trade, with the condition that trade goods were sourced from Curaçao.

Jewish settlers in Aruba, likely driven by the economic decline in Curaçao, engaged in smuggling discreetly. Fluent in Spanish, they leveraged their connections with the mainland via the predominantly Jewish-controlled Curaçao trade (see History of the Jews in Curaçao). The Sephardim, facing economic challenges, established independent trading colonies in the Caribbean around 1796, maintaining close links with Curaçao in trade, religion, and marriage. Smuggling played a pivotal role in Jews choosing Aruba as their settlement. Choosing Paardenbaai ("Bay of Horses") as a trading hub, rather than Commandeursbaai ("Commander's bay") in Savaneta was influenced by its improved ship accessibility and the ongoing prohibition of trade and settlement east of Hooiberg, which included Commandeursbaai.

They exported local products like cattle, sheep, poultry, Antillean dyewood (Haematoxylum brasiletto), and gold after 1824. However, the primary trade involved importing goods from Curaçao, which were then smuggled ashore using small vessels along the Venezuelan coast, in Coro, and nearby areas. Imports encompassed items such as food, clothing, tools, and more. Additionally, red slaves were transported from the mainland.

Illegal trade from Paardenbaai spurred the growth of Playa village. The command's relocation played a key role in this development. Although the exact date of the commander's move to Playa is unknown, Fort Zoutman was erected in 1798, marking a significant period when traders shifted from Ponton to Paardenbaai. Following the commander's arrival, milestones in the village's early history included the construction of the first Catholic church, between 1800 and 1810 and the arrival of the initial Protestant religious instructor, Klaas van Eekhout, in 1822 were milestones in the early history of the village. The trade boom, however, saw a decline around 1822 or 1823 due to a civil war, during which Simon Bolivar and the independence movement expelled the Spaniards from South America. Similar to Curaçao, trade dwindled, but a new drive for Aruban colonization emerged—the discovery of gold in 1824. During the visit of Governor Paulus Roelof Cantz'laar in 1824, the village was named Oranjestad after William I of the Netherlands.

Hoezee! Hoezee! Hoezee! Lang leve de Oranjestad! zij groeije en bloeije!

Hooray! Hooray! Hooray! Long live Oranjestad! May it grow and flourish!

— Gerardus B. Bosch, Reizen in West-Indië, en door een gedeelte van Zuid-en Noord-Amerika. Tweede Deel (1836)

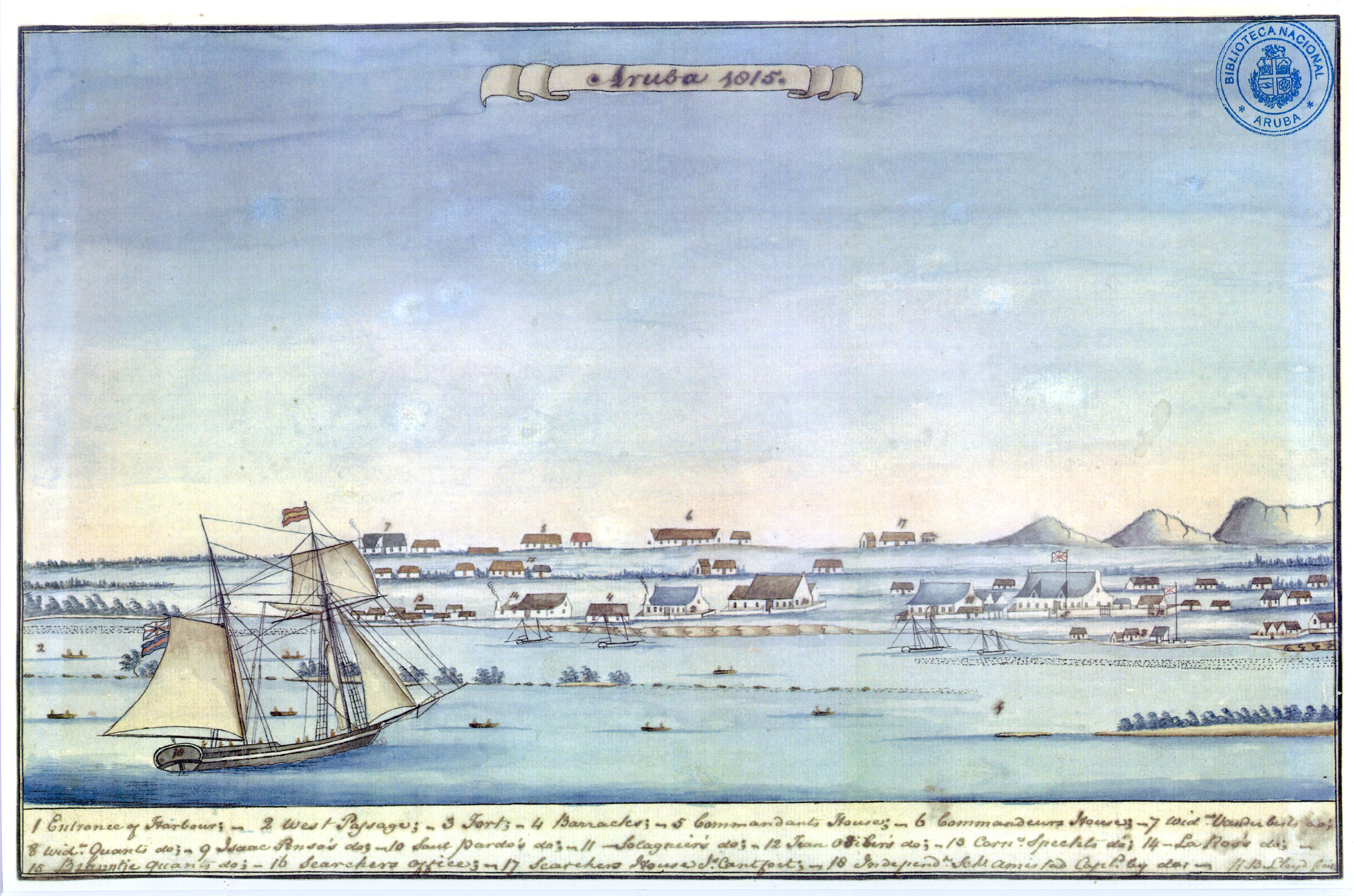
Aruba 1815 depicts Paardenbaai harbour and village at the bay during the English interregnum.

In 1805, Paardenbaai had 32 houses, which increased to 185 by 1824 and 196 by 1832. The village was described in 1837 as "of great size but so irregularly built that it resembles more a heap of scattered houses than anything that can be called a city". In 1860, approximately 1,000 out of Aruba's 2,849 inhabitants resided in the capital.

In Oranjestad-west, the Ranchoe (or Rancho) area formed a distinct neighborhood where the majority of the island's fishing population resided. In 1837, the Socotoro, a governmental plantation, cultivated cochineal known for its carmine-red dye, and by 1845 Socotoro was allocated for aloe cultivation. Socotoro was not the sole plantation or area in Oranjestad to have cultivated the cochineal mites; Companashi, Mon Plaisir, and Sividivi were also included.

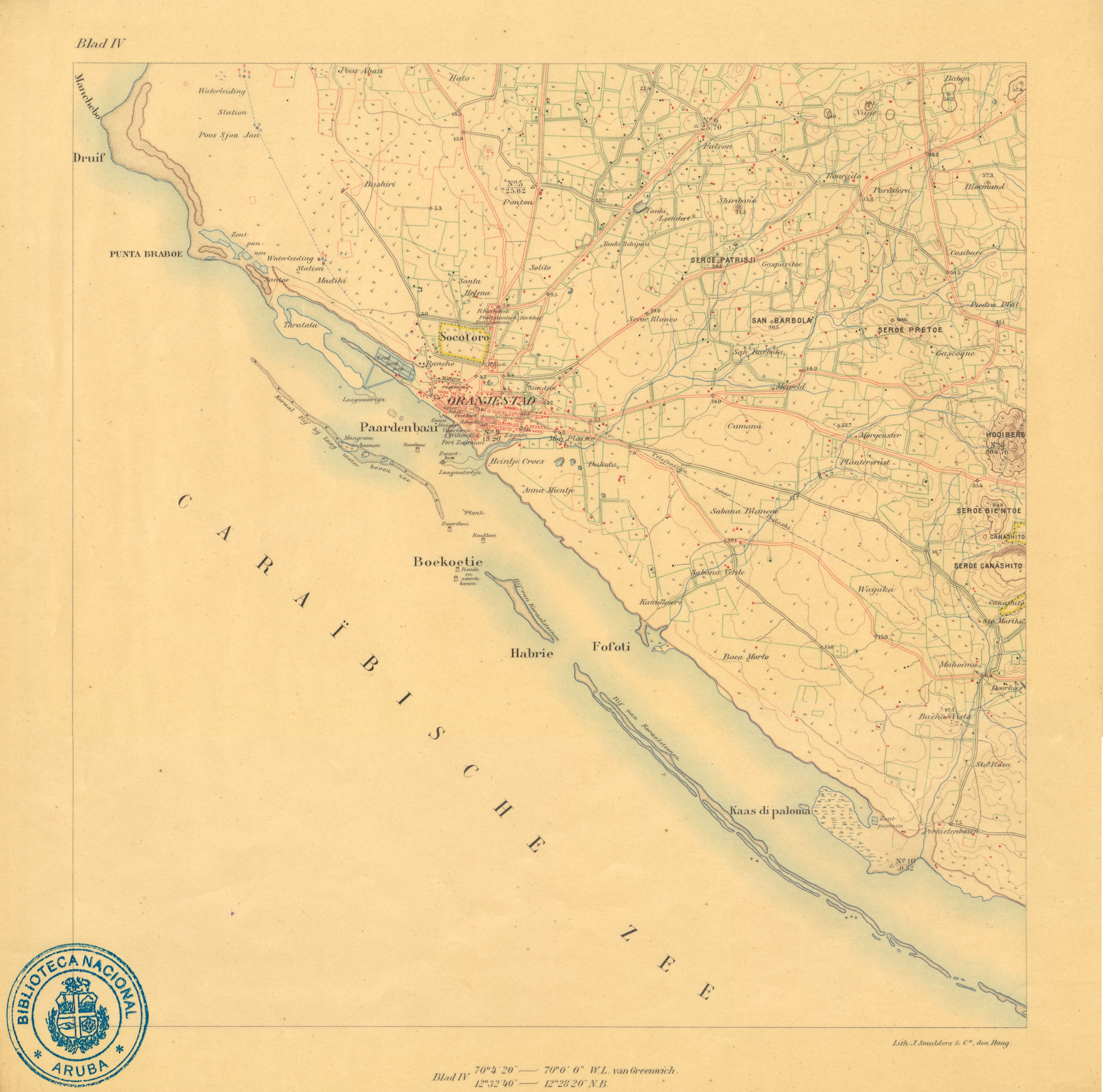
Former Socotoro state plantation (1912)

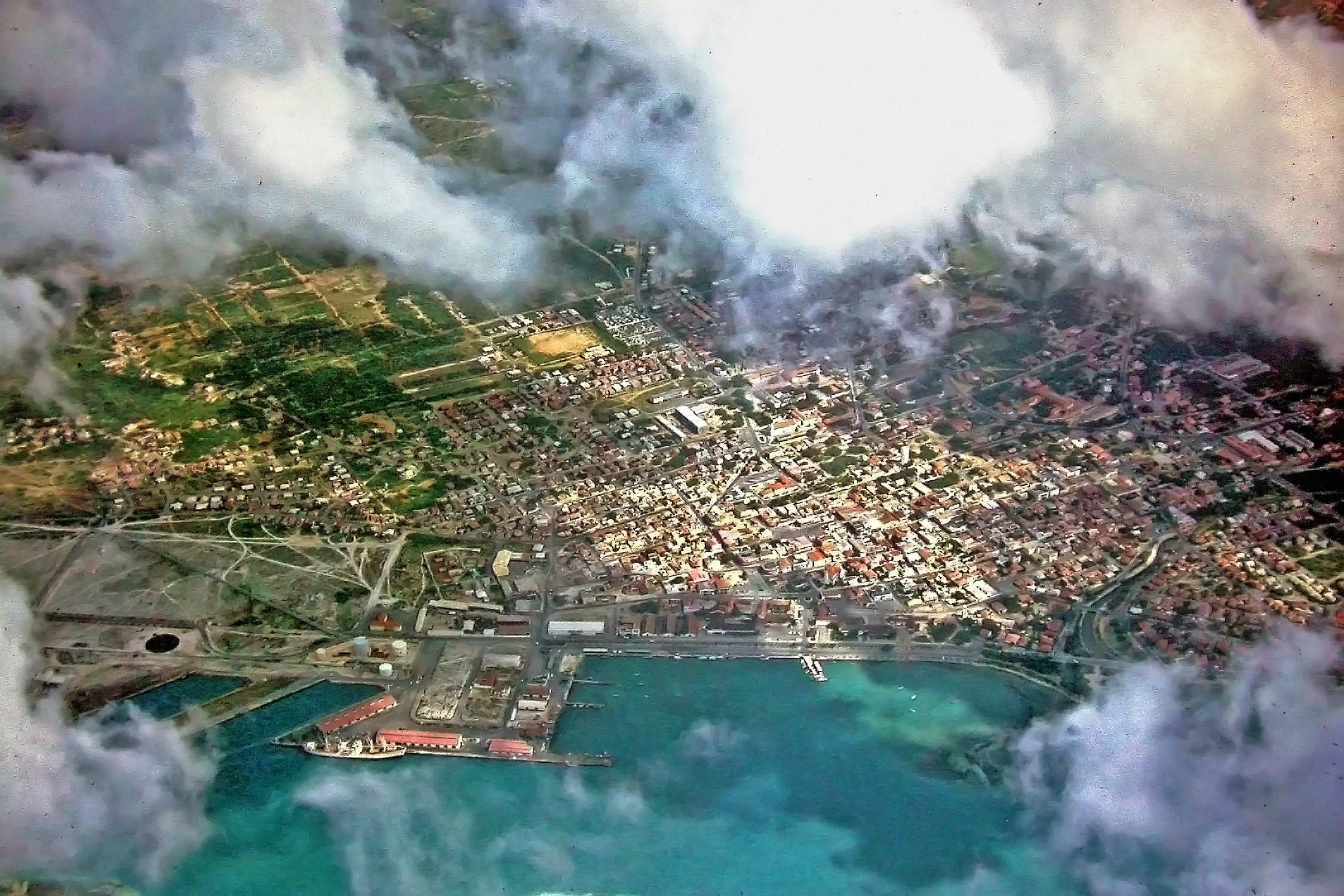
Aerial view of Oranjestad and the bay (1964)

The establishment of the Lago Oil and Transport Company and Arend Petroleum Company, oil refineries, not only led to a population increase but also brought about a significant increase in prosperity for Oranjestad. In Oranjestad along Paardenbaai, residents included traders, shopkeepers, and craftsmen. A select few, with larger pieces of land, ships, and shops, constituted the wealthier class. However, excessive wealth was rare. City houses usually resembled those in the districts. Notably luxurious city houses emerged in the period following the arrival of the oil industry (c. 1924-1930), as the business elite capitalized on the economic boost brought about by the oil industry.

== Geography ==
In terms of geomorphology, Oranjestad is situated on limestone sediments from the Early Miocene, dating back to approximately 24 Ma. The city also includes man-made expansion into the sea, featuring notable areas such as the Renaissance Marketplace (formerly Seaport Marketplace) and Queen Wilhelmina Park situated on reclaimed land. Additionally, the Important Bird Area MPA Oranjestad Reef Islands is located adjacent to the main harbor.

=== Regions and zones ===
Aruba is categorized into eight regions, each with its respective zones. Oranjestad is further divided into two regions: Oranjestad West and Oranjestad East, each comprising eight zones.

Oranjestad West

- Pos Abou/Cunucu Abou
- Eagle/Paardenbaai
- Madiki Kavel
- Madiki/Rancho
- Paradijswijk/Santa Helena
- Socotoro/Rancho
- Ponton
- Companashi/Solito

Oranjestad East

- Nassaustraat
- Klip/Mon Plaisir
- Sividivi
- Sero Blanco/Cumana
- Dakota/Potrero
- Tarabana
- Sabana Blanco/Mahuma
- Simeon Antonio

=== Climate ===
Oranjestad has a hot semi-arid climate (Köppen BSh). Temperatures are high year-round, the air is humid with low diurnal temperature variation also year-round, whilst rainfall is very low due to the region lying in a zone of divergence between the southeast trade winds to the south and the North American Monsoon further north. The exception to this aridity occurs during the short rainy season from September to January when the southward retreat of the Intertropical Convergence Zone generates more frequent moist northeasterly winds.

Climate data for Oranjestad, Aruba (normals 1991–2020, extremes 1951–2020)
Month	Jan	Feb	Mar	Apr	May	Jun	Jul	Aug	Sep	Oct	Nov	Dec	Year
Record high °C (°F)	32.5 (90.5)	33.0 (91.4)	33.9 (93.0)	34.4 (93.9)	34.9 (94.8)	35.2 (95.4)	35.3 (95.5)	36.1 (97.0)	36.5 (97.7)	35.4 (95.7)	35.0 (95.0)	34.8 (94.6)	36.5 (97.7)
Mean daily maximum °C (°F)	30.3 (86.5)	30.6 (87.1)	31.1 (88.0)	31.9 (89.4)	32.4 (90.3)	32.5 (90.5)	32.4 (90.3)	33.2 (91.8)	33.2 (91.8)	32.4 (90.3)	31.5 (88.7)	30.7 (87.3)	31.8 (89.2)
Daily mean °C (°F)	27.0 (80.6)	27.1 (80.8)	27.4 (81.3)	28.2 (82.8)	28.7 (83.7)	29.0 (84.2)	28.9 (84.0)	29.5 (85.1)	29.6 (85.3)	29.1 (84.4)	28.4 (83.1)	27.5 (81.5)	28.4 (83.1)
Mean daily minimum °C (°F)	24.8 (76.6)	24.8 (76.6)	25.3 (77.5)	26.0 (78.8)	26.7 (80.1)	26.9 (80.4)	26.7 (80.1)	27.2 (81.0)	27.3 (81.1)	26.7 (80.1)	26.0 (78.8)	25.3 (77.5)	26.1 (79.0)
Record low °C (°F)	19.0 (66.2)	20.6 (69.1)	21.2 (70.2)	21.5 (70.7)	21.8 (71.2)	22.7 (72.9)	21.2 (70.2)	21.3 (70.3)	22.1 (71.8)	21.9 (71.4)	22.0 (71.6)	20.5 (68.9)	19.0 (66.2)
Average rainfall mm (inches)	44.0 (1.73)	19.5 (0.77)	10.0 (0.39)	8.6 (0.34)	14.1 (0.56)	17.4 (0.69)	19.6 (0.77)	31.4 (1.24)	42.9 (1.69)	76.5 (3.01)	87.1 (3.43)	80.1 (3.15)	451.1 (17.76)
Average rainy days (≥ 1.0 mm)	10.8	4.5	2.0	1.5	1.7	2.8	4.1	3.1	3.3	7.3	9.6	11.0	61.7
Average relative humidity (%)	77.8	76.2	75.9	76.9	77.9	77.4	77.8	75.6	76.2	77.9	78.8	77.9	77.2
Average dew point °C (°F)	22.5 (72.5)	22.2 (72.0)	22.5 (72.5)	23.4 (74.1)	24.2 (75.6)	24.4 (75.9)	24.4 (75.9)	24.8 (76.6)	25.0 (77.0)	24.6 (76.3)	24.0 (75.2)	23.2 (73.8)	23.8 (74.8)
Mean monthly sunshine hours	282.5	275.8	303.8	287.4	297.9	299.0	305.3	301.7	280.5	257.3	248.4	270.4	3,410
Source 1: Departamento Meteorologico Aruba
Source 2: Weather.Directory

== Culture ==
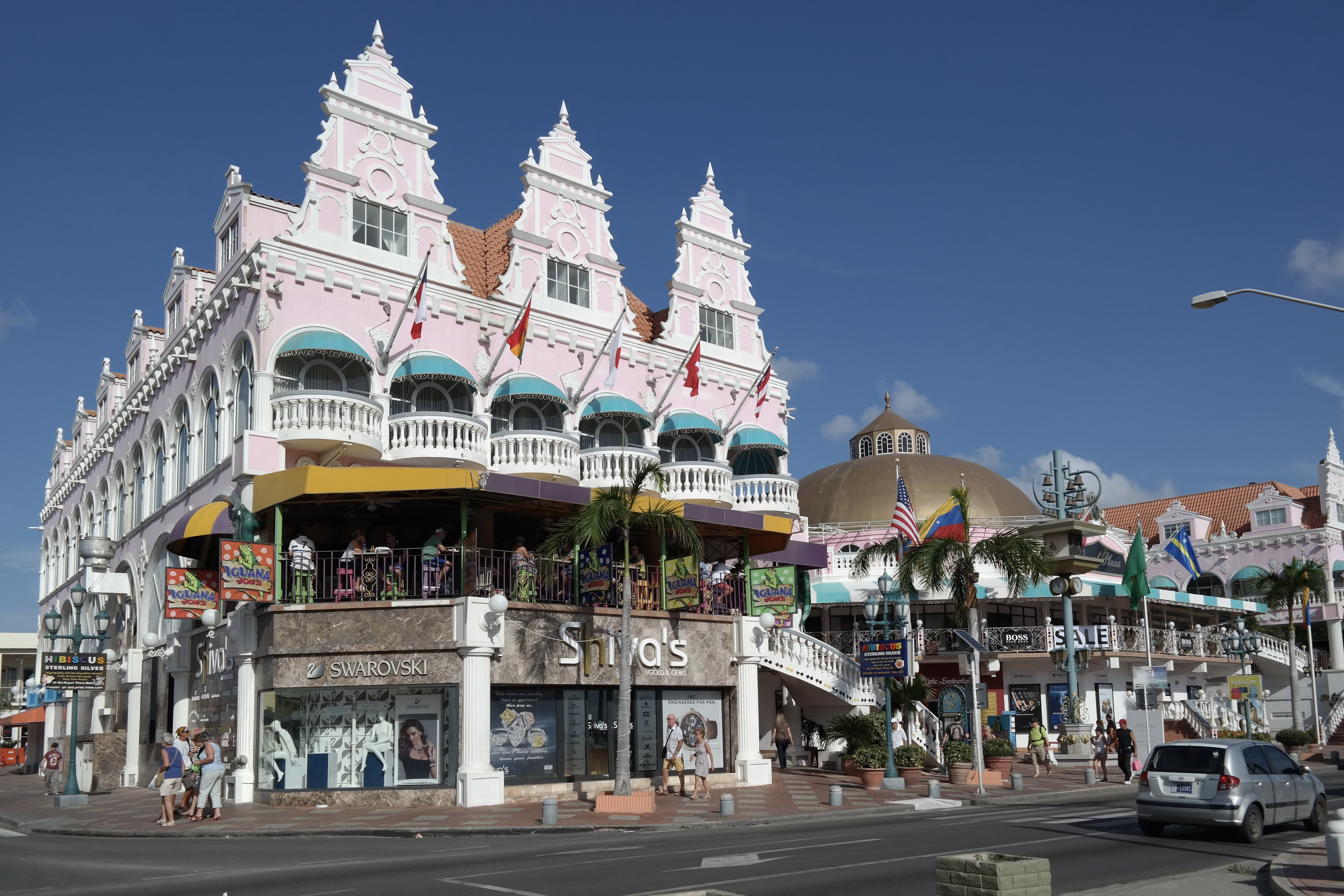
The Royal Plaza Mall in Dutch Colonial architecture.

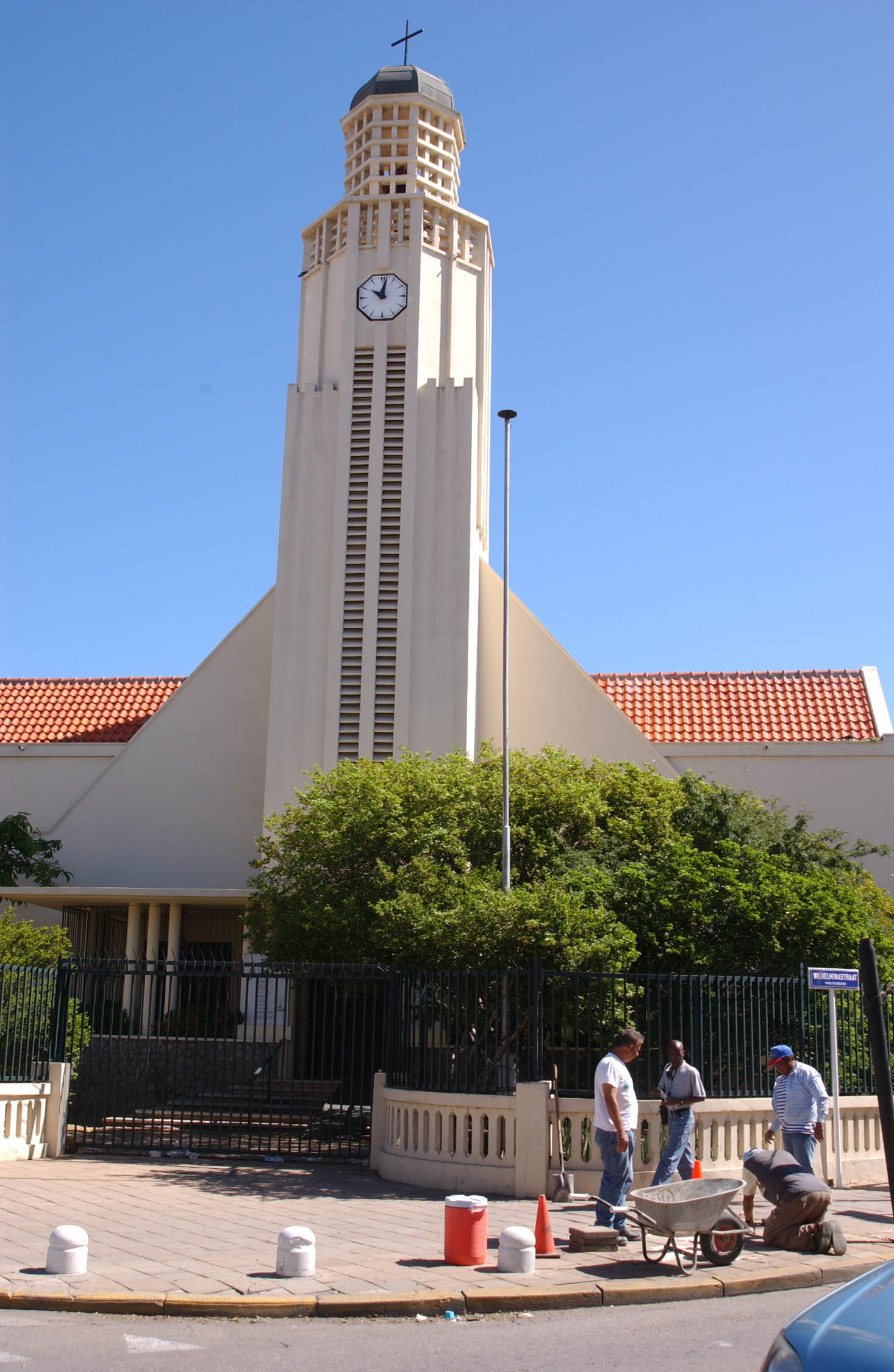
The New Protestant Church in 2004.

There is some Dutch Colonial architecture. Due to increased government interest in maintaining the island's cultural heritage, a number of old buildings and houses in the center of town have been transformed into colorfully restored landmarks, such as the lime-colored City Hall on Wilhelminastraat.

=== Sports ===
Oranjestad is home to the football teams SV Dakota, SV Racing Club Aruba, and SV River Plate Aruba, all of which play in the top Aruban Division di Honor.

== Economy ==
Air Aruba once had its headquarters in Oranjestad. Air Aruba suspended its operations on 23 October 2000.

Tiara Air has had its head office in Oranjestad since 2006, except between 2014 and 2016 when the company suspended services due to the Venezuelan Airline Crisis.

=== Tourism ===
Several modern recreations have emerged, including the outdoor shopping mall at Royal Plaza, and a few scattered buildings along Main Street and on the Main Square.

The late 18th century Fort Zoutman is one of the town's main attractions and the oldest structure on Aruba. It is regarded by UNESCO as a 'Place of Memory of the Slave Trade Route in the Latin Caribbean'. Others attractions on the island include the tax-free harbour and the Willem III Tower, located near the fort.

There are about eight museums on the island.

=== Renaissance Island ===
The touristically named Renaissance Island (formerly Sonesta Island) is a 40-acre (16 ha) cay (or barrier reef) island, officially known as the Bucuti Rif off the coast near Oranjestad. It is privately owned and has the only private beaches on Aruba. There are two beaches: Iguana Beach and Flamingo Beach. A Beechcraft 18 and a Convair 400 were both deliberately sunk about 50 yards (46 m) offshore to create a diving site. Flamingoes can be seen on the island. However, they are not native to Aruba.

== Transport ==
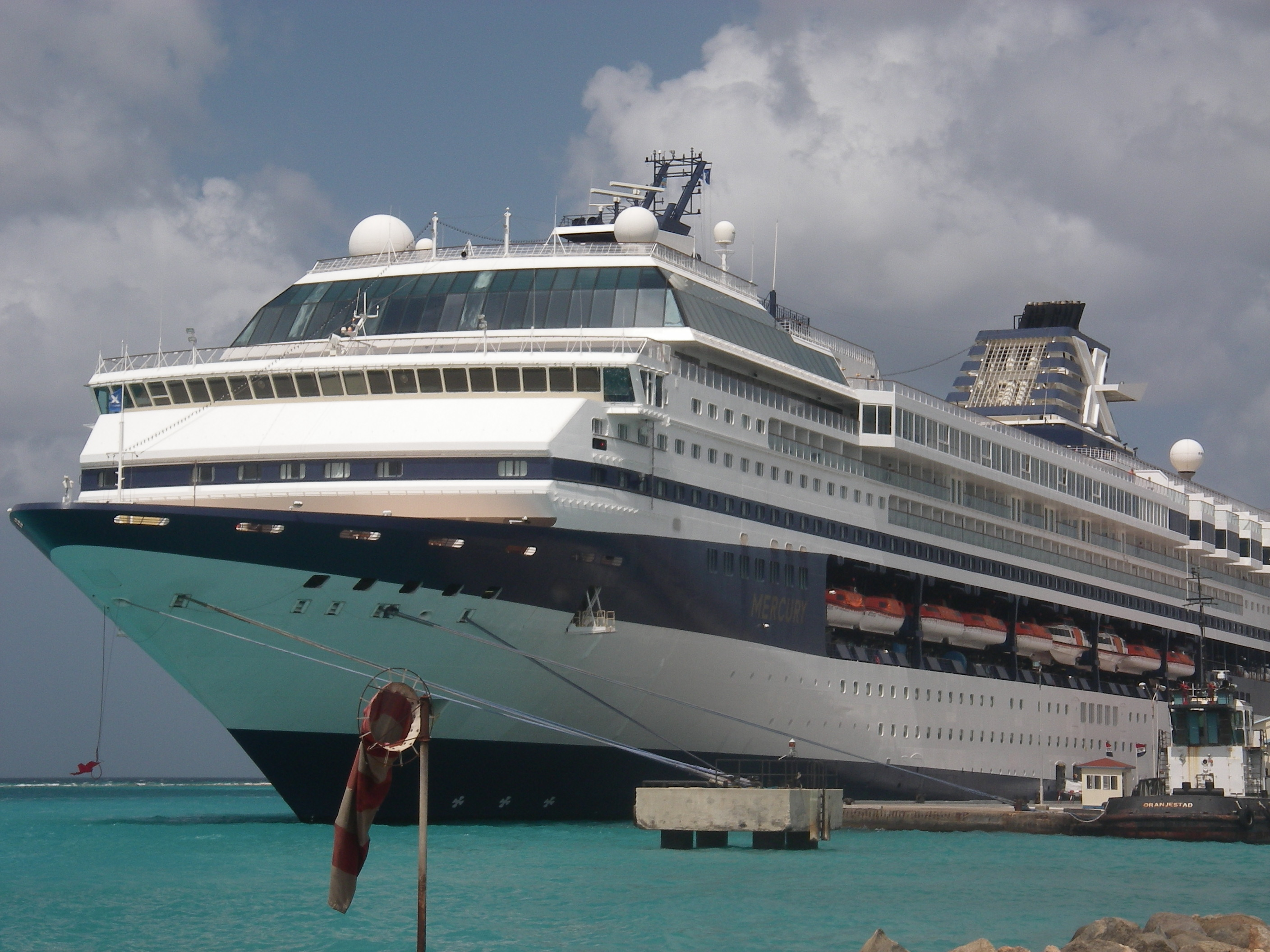
The cruise ship MV Mercury docked in 2006

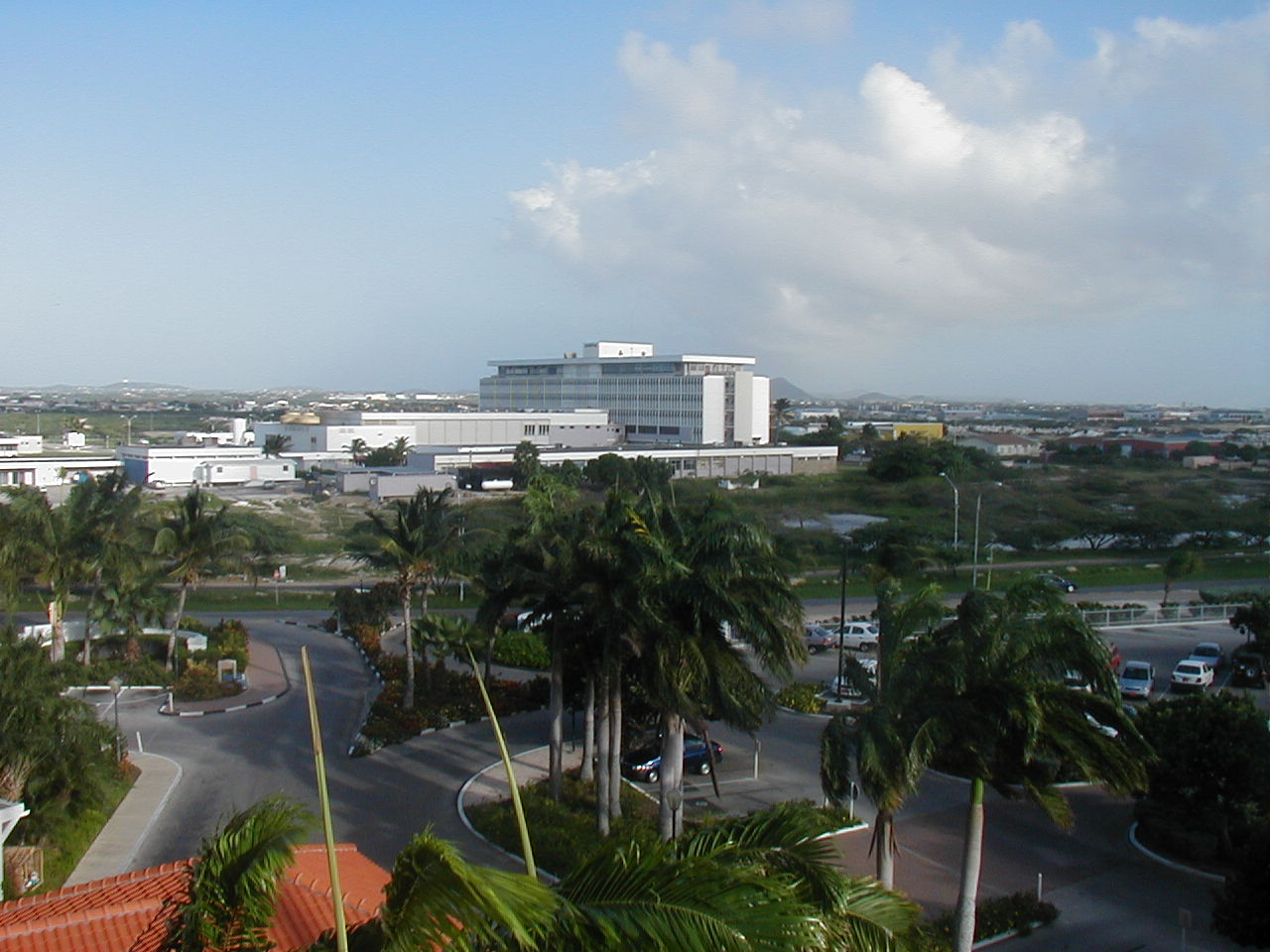
Dr. Horacio E. Oduber Hospital in 2003

Oranjestad is conveniently connected to the Queen Beatrix International Airport, located 2.5 kilometres (1.6 mi) from the city center. The downtown area is serviced by a tramway line.

Caya G. F. Betico Croes, commonly known as Main Street or Caya, serves as Aruba's primary shopping destination in Oranjestad. However, in recent years, shoppers have increasingly favored Lloyd G. Smith Boulevard, the city's main thoroughfare. This shift is partly due to the boulevard's proximity to the cruise ship terminal ad harbour area.

Paardenbaai is the largest passenger port on the island, accommodating up to five vessels. For cargo vessels, there's a port at Barcadera, situated 5 kilometres (3.1 mi) to the east. Plans are underway to enhance loading capacity at Oranjestad, including the construction of a marina to address the insufficient docking space for yachts and fishing boats.

== Education ==
Oranjestad is home to the University of Aruba, which offers programs in law and economics, and to the island's largest secondary school (Colegio Arubano), both modeled on the Dutch system. Many students enroll in universities in the Netherlands for graduate and postgraduate degrees.

== People ==
- Dave Benton, winner of the Eurovision Song Contest 2001 for Estonia
- Xander Bogaerts, baseball player, two-time World Series champion
- Bobby Farrell, singer, Boney M
- Vince Irie, singer-songwriter
- Chadwick Tromp, baseball player, Atlanta Braves

== See also ==
- Elias Mansur Stadion

== Sources ==
- Alofs, Luc (1997). Savaneta, een vlek of dorp [Savaneta, a hamlet or village].
- Alofs, Luc; Merkies, Leontine (2001). Ken ta Arubiano?: sociale integratie en natievorming op Aruba, 1924-2001 [Who is Aruban?: Social Integration and Nation Formation on Aruba, 1924-2001] (in Dutch). Oranjestad: VAD/De Wit Stores.
- Benjamins, Herman Daniël; Snelleman, Johannes (1917). Encyclopaedie van Nederlandsch West-Indië (in Dutch). Leiden: Martinus Nijhoff Publishers. Aruba.
- Bosch, Gerardus Balthasar (1836). Reizen in West-Indië, en door een gedeelte van Zuid-en Noord-Amerika [Travels in the West Indies, and through a portion of South and North America] (in Dutch). Vol. 2. Utrecht: L.E. Bosch.
- Hartog, Johan (1980). Aruba: zoals het was, zoals het werd: van de tijd der Indianen tot op heden [Aruba: As it was, as it became: From the time of the Indians to the present] (in Dutch). Aruba: Van Dorp.
- Karner, Frances P. (1969). The Sephardics of Curaçao: A Study of Socio-Cultural Patterns in Flux. Assen, Netherlands: Van Gorcum & Comp N.V.
- Lennep Coster, G. van (1842). "Het eiland Aruba". Aanteekeningen, gehouden gedurende mijn verblijf in de West-Indiën, in de jaren 1837-1840 [Notes kept during my stay in the West Indies, in the years 1837-1840] (in Dutch). Amsterdam: Schleijer. pp. 90–105.
- Nooyen, R.H. (1965). Millefiori di Aruba [Millefiori of Aruba] (in Papiamento). Oranjestad, Aruba: Publica cu cooperacion di Stichting Aruba Nostra.
