= Calcium sulfate =

Chemical derived from gypsum used in food and industry

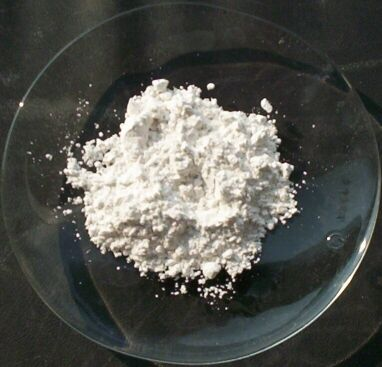
- Calcium sulfate hemihydrate powder Calcium sulfate hemihydrate

Names
- IUPAC name Calcium sulfate
- Other names Sulfate of lime Plaster of Paris; Drierite; Gypsum

Identifiers
CAS Number	7778-18-9; (hemihydrate): 10034-76-1; (dihydrate): 10101-41-4
3D model (JSmol)	Interactive image
ChEBI	CHEBI:31346; (dihydrate): CHEBI:32583
ChEMBL	ChEMBL2106140
ChemSpider	22905
DrugBank	DB15533
ECHA InfoCard	100.029.000
EC Number	231-900-3
E number	E516 (acidity regulators, ...)
Gmelin Reference	7487
KEGG	C13194; D09201
PubChem CID	(dihydrate): 24928
RTECS number	WS6920000; (dihydrate): MG2360000
UNII	E934B3V59H; (hemihydrate): 3RW091J48V; (dihydrate): 4846Q921YM
CompTox Dashboard (EPA)	DTXSID9029699
- InChI: InChI=1S/Ca.H2O4S/c;1-5(2,3)4/h;(H2,1,2,3,4)/q+2;/p-2 Key: OSGAYBCDTDRGGQ-UHFFFAOYSA-L; InChI=1/Ca.H2O4S/c;1-5(2,3)4/h;(H2,1,2,3,4)/q+2;/p-2 Key: OSGAYBCDTDRGGQ-NUQVWONBAU
- SMILES: [Ca+2].[O-]S([O-])(=O)=O

Properties
Chemical formula	CaSO_{4}
Molar mass	136.141 g/mol (anhydrous); 145.149 g/mol (hemihydrate); 172.171 g/mol (dihydrate)
Appearance	white solid
Odor	odorless
Density	2.96 g/cm^{3} (anhydrous); 2.32 g/cm^{3} (dihydrate)
Melting point	1,460 °C (2,660 °F; 1,730 K) (anhydrous)
Solubility in water	dihydrate 2.63 g/L (25 °C)
Solubility product (K_{sp})	4.93 × 10^{−5} mol^{2}L^{−2} (anhydrous); 3.14 × 10^{−5} (dihydrate)
Solubility in glycerol	slightly soluble (dihydrate)
Acidity (pK_{a})	10.4 (anhydrous); 7.3 (dihydrate)
Magnetic susceptibility (χ)	−49.7·10^{−6} cm^{3}/mol

Structure
Crystal structure	orthorhombic

Thermochemistry
Std molar entropy (S^{⦵}_{298})	107 J·mol^{−1}·K^{−1}
Std enthalpy of formation (Δ_{f}H^{⦵}_{298})	−1433 kJ/mol

Hazards
NFPA 704 (fire diamond)	1 0 0
Flash point	Non-flammable
- NIOSH (US health exposure limits)
PEL (Permissible)	TWA 15 mg/m^{3} (total) TWA 5 mg/m^{3} (resp) [for anhydrous form only]
REL (Recommended)	TWA 10 mg/m^{3} (total) TWA 5 mg/m^{3} (resp) [anhydrous only]
IDLH (Immediate danger)	N.D.
Safety data sheet (SDS)	ICSC 1589

Related compounds
Other cations	Magnesium sulfate Strontium sulfate Barium sulfate
Related desiccants	Calcium chloride Magnesium sulfate
Related compounds	Plaster of Paris; Gypsum
- Except where otherwise noted, data are given for materials in their standard state (at 25 °C [77 °F], 100 kPa). verify (what is ?) Infobox references

Calcium sulfate (or calcium sulphate) is an inorganic salt with the chemical formula CaSO_{4}. It occurs in several hydrated forms; the anhydrous state (known as anhydrite) is a white crystalline solid often found in evaporite deposits. Its dihydrate form is the mineral gypsum, which may be dehydrated to produce bassanite, the hemihydrate state. Gypsum occurs in nature as crystals (selenite) or fibrous masses (satin spar), typically colorless to white, though impurities can impart other hues. All forms of calcium sulfate are sparingly soluble in water and cause permanent hardness when dissolved therein.

== Hydration states ==
Calcium sulfate occurs at three levels of hydration with different crystallographic structures: anhydrous, dihydrate, and hemihydrate.

The anhydrous CaSO_{4} (anhydrite) crystallizes as an tightly-bound orthorhombic lattice with space group Pnma, in which each Ca^{2+} is 8-coordinated, or surrounded, by 8 oxygen atoms from tetrahedral SO^{2−}_{4}. It is similar in topology to zircon.

The dihydrate CaSO_{4}·2H_{2}O (gypsum) forms a monoclinic crystal with space group C2/c. Its structure consists of alternating layers: one with Ca^{2+} coordinated with tetrahedral SO^{2−}_{4} and another with interstitial water molecules.

The hemihydrate CaSO_{4}·1/2H_{2}O (bassanite) is also known as plaster of Paris. Specific hemihydrates are sometimes distinguished between α-hemihydrate and β-hemihydrate.

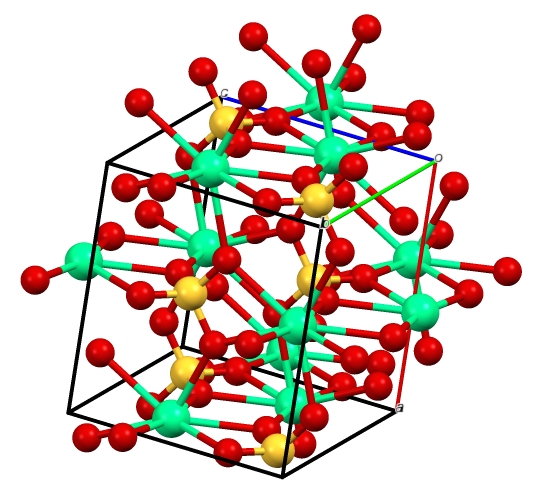
The structure of hemihydrate calcium sulfate is a network of Ca-O-S bonds. Color code: red (O), green (Ca), yellow (S).

== Uses ==
The main use of calcium sulfate is to produce plaster of Paris and stucco. These applications exploit the fact that calcium sulfate which has been powdered and calcined forms a moldable paste upon hydration and hardens as crystalline calcium sulfate dihydrate. It is also convenient that calcium sulfate is poorly soluble in water and does not readily dissolve in contact with water after its solidification.

=== Hydration and dehydration reactions ===
With judicious heating, gypsum converts to the partially dehydrated mineral called bassanite or plaster of Paris. This material has the formula CaSO_{4}·(nH_{2}O), where 0.5 ≤ n ≤ 0.8. Temperatures between 100 and 150 °C (212–302 °F) are required to drive off the water within its structure. The details of the temperature and time depend on ambient humidity. Temperatures as high as 170 °C (338 °F) are used in industrial calcination, but at these temperatures γ-anhydrite begins to form. The heat energy delivered to the gypsum at this time (the heat of hydration) tends to go into driving off water (as water vapor) rather than increasing the temperature of the mineral, which rises slowly until the water is gone, then increases more rapidly. The equation for the partial dehydration is:

CaSO_{4} · 2 H_{2}O → CaSO_{4} · 1/2 H_{2}O + 1 1/2 H_{2}O↑

The endothermic property of this reaction is relevant to the performance of drywall, conferring fire resistance to residential and other structures. In a fire, the structure behind a sheet of drywall will remain relatively cool as water is lost from the gypsum, thus preventing (or substantially retarding) damage to the framing (through combustion of wood members or loss of strength of steel at high temperatures) and consequent structural collapse. But at higher temperatures, calcium sulfate will release oxygen and act as an oxidizing agent. This property is used in aluminothermy. In contrast to most minerals, which when rehydrated simply form liquid or semi-liquid pastes, or remain powdery, calcined gypsum has an unusual property: when mixed with water at normal (ambient) temperatures, it quickly reverts chemically to the preferred dihydrate form, while physically "setting" to form a rigid and relatively strong gypsum crystal lattice:

CaSO_{4} · 1/2 H_{2}O + 1 1/2 H_{2}O → CaSO_{4} · 2 H_{2}O

This reaction is exothermic and is responsible for the ease with which gypsum can be cast into various shapes including sheets (for drywall), sticks (for blackboard chalk), and molds (to immobilize broken bones, or for metal casting). Mixed with polymers, it has been used as a bone repair cement. Small amounts of calcined gypsum are added to earth to create strong structures directly from cast earth, an alternative to adobe (which loses its strength when wet). The conditions of dehydration can be changed to adjust the porosity of the hemihydrate, resulting in the so-called α- and β-hemihydrates (which are more or less chemically identical).

On heating to 180 °C (356 °F), the nearly water-free form, called γ-anhydrite (CaSO_{4}·nH_{2}O where n = 0 to 0.05) is produced. γ-Anhydrite slowly reabsorbs water to return to the dihydrate state, a property exploited in some commercial desiccants. On heating above 250 °C, the completely anhydrous form called β-anhydrite or "natural" anhydrite is formed. Natural anhydrite does not absorb water, even over geological timescales, unless very finely ground.

The variable composition of the hemihydrate and γ-anhydrite, and their easy inter-conversion, is due to their nearly identical crystal structures containing "channels" that can accommodate variable amounts of water, or other small molecules such as methanol.

=== Food industry ===
The calcium sulfate hydrates are used as a coagulant in products such as tofu.

For the FDA, it is permitted in cheese and related cheese products; cereal flours, bakery products, frozen desserts, artificial sweeteners for jelly & preserves, condiment vegetables, and condiment tomatoes, and some candies.

It is known in the E number series as E516, and the UN's FAO knows it as a firming agent, a flour treatment agent, a sequestrant, and a leavening agent.

=== Dentistry ===
Calcium sulfate has a long history of use in dentistry. It has been used in bone regeneration as a graft material and graft binder (or extender) and as a barrier in guided bone tissue regeneration. It is a biocompatible material and is completely resorbed following implantation. It does not evoke a significant host response and creates a calcium-rich milieu in the area of implantation.

=== Desiccant ===
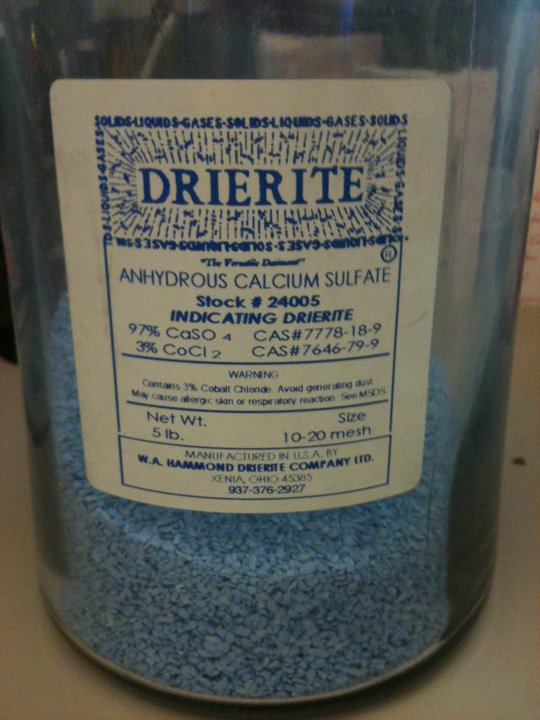
The desiccant Drierite

When sold at the anhydrous state as a desiccant with a color-indicating agent under the name Drierite, it appears blue (anhydrous) or pink (hydrated) due to impregnation with cobalt(II) chloride, which functions as a moisture indicator.

=== Sulfuric acid production ===
Up to the 1970s, commercial quantities of sulfuric acid were produced from anhydrous calcium sulfate. Upon being mixed with shale or marl, and roasted at 1400°C, the sulfate liberates sulfur dioxide gas, a precursor to sulfuric acid. The reaction also produces calcium silicate, used in cement clinker production.

2 CaSO_{4} + 2 SiO_{2} + C → 2 CaSiO_{3} + 2 SO_{2} + CO_{2}

Some component reactions pertaining to calcium sulfate:

CaSO_{4} + 2 C → CaS + 2 CO_{2}
3 CaSO_{4} + CaS + 2 SiO_{2} → 2 Ca_{2}SiO_{4} + 4 SO_{2}
3 CaSO_{4} + CaS → 4 CaO + 4 SO_{2}
Ca_{2}SiO_{4} + CaO → Ca_{3}OSiO_{4}

== Production and occurrence ==
The main sources of calcium sulfate are naturally occurring gypsum and anhydrite, which occur at many locations worldwide as evaporites. These may be extracted by open-cast quarrying or by deep mining. World production of natural gypsum is around 127 million tonnes per annum.

In addition to natural sources, calcium sulfate is produced as a by-product in a number of processes:

- In flue-gas desulfurization, exhaust gases from fossil-fuel power stations and other processes (e.g. cement manufacture) are scrubbed to reduce their sulfur dioxide content, by injecting finely ground limestone:

SO_{2} + 0.5 O_{2} + CaCO_{3} → CaSO_{4} + CO_{2}

Related sulfur-trapping methods use lime and some produces an impure calcium sulfite, which oxidizes on storage to calcium sulfate.

- In the production of phosphoric acid from phosphate rock, calcium phosphate is treated with sulfuric acid and calcium sulfate precipitates. The product, called phosphogypsum is often contaminated with impurities making its use uneconomic.
- In the production of hydrogen fluoride, calcium fluoride is treated with sulfuric acid, precipitating calcium sulfate.
- In the refining of zinc, solutions of zinc sulfate are treated with hydrated lime to co-precipitate heavy metals such as barium.
- Calcium sulfate can also be recovered and re-used from scrap drywall at construction sites.

These precipitation processes tend to concentrate radioactive elements in the calcium sulfate product. This issue is particular with the phosphate by-product, since phosphate ores naturally contain uranium and its decay products such as radium-226, lead-210 and polonium-210. Extraction of uranium from phosphorus ores can be economical on its own depending on prices on the uranium market or the separation of uranium can be mandated by environmental legislation and its sale is used to recover part of the cost of the process.

Calcium sulfate is also a common component of fouling deposits in industrial heat exchangers, because its solubility decreases with increasing temperature (see the specific section on the retrograde solubility).

== Solubility ==
Temperature dependence of the solubility of calcium sulfate (3 phases) in pure water.

The solubility of calcium sulfate decreases as temperature increases. This behaviour ("retrograde solubility") is uncommon: dissolution of most of the salts is endothermic and their solubility increases with temperature. The retrograde solubility of calcium sulfate is also responsible for its precipitation in the hottest zone of heating systems and for its contribution to the formation of scale in boilers along with the precipitation of calcium carbonate whose solubility also decreases when CO_{2} degasses from hot water or can escape out of the system.

== See also ==
- Alabaster
- Anhydrite
- Bathybius haeckelii
- Chalk (calcium carbonate)
- Gypsum
- Gypsum plaster
- Phosphogypsum
- Selenite (mineral)
- Flue-gas desulfurization
