= Gypsum concrete =

Flooring underlayment

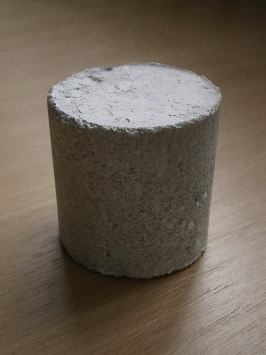
Phosphorgypsum-based concrete with sawdust aggregate

Gypsum concrete is a building material used as a floor underlayment used in wood-frame and concrete construction for fire ratings, sound reduction, radiant heating, and floor leveling. It is a mixture of gypsum plaster, Portland cement, and sand.

Gypsum concrete is sometimes called gypcrete by construction professionals, as a generic name in common usage (but not in law), but that is an alteration of Gyp-Crete, a Maxxon trademark for its brand of gypsum concrete. Other common brands of gypsum concrete include Levelrock (from US Gypsum) and Firm-Fill.

== Composition ==
U.S. patent 4,444,925 lists the components of Gyp-Crete as atmospheric calcined gypsum, sand, water, and small amounts of various additives. Additives listed include polyvinyl alcohol, an extender such as sodium citrate or fly ash, a surfactant such as Colloid defoamer 1513 DD made by Colloids, Inc., and a fluidizer based on sodium or potassium derivatives of naphthalene sulfonate formaldehyde condensate. One example mix is shown below.

Component	Amount	Approximate Percentage
Atmospheric calcined gypsum	80 lbs	24%
Polyvinyl Alcohol	0.45 lbs^{1}	0.14%
Extender	22.27 gr	0.00098%
Fluidizer	108.8 gr	0.0047%
Sand	150-200 lbs	57%
Water	6.5-8.5 gal	19%

The purpose of the polyvinyl alcohol is to prevent the surface of the concrete from becoming dusty. While the exact mechanism is not known, it is thought that as the concrete sets, water migrates to the surface, bringing with it fine, dusty particles. When the water evaporates, the dusty particles are deposited on the surface. It is thought that the polyvinyl alcohol prevents the dusty particles from migrating upwards with the water.

The mix is prepared on site using a specialized truck. The truck contains a tank for water, a mixing tank, a holding tank, a pump, and a conveyor for the sand and calcined gypsum. A hopper for the sand and gypsum is mounted externally on the vehicle.

To prepare the mix, the sand and calcined gypsum are added to the hopper and mixed. Most of the required water is added to the mixing tank, then the sand and calcined gypsum are mixed in. Once all the sand and calcined gypsum have been mixed in, the rest of the water is added until the proper consistency is attained. Finally, the additives are mixed in and the whole batch of concrete is moved to the holding tank to be pumped out into the required area via long hoses. A small sample is taken from the batch and set aside so that the set-up time can be observed and adjustments can be made to the amount of additives so that the timing is correct.

Once the mix has been poured, little leveling, if any, is needed. The mix should be smoothed gently with a flat board, such as a 40” 1x4. This helps to concentrate the calcined gypsum at the surface.

=== Previous formulations ===
U.S. patent 4,075,374 lists the by-weight formulation as 10 parts pressure calcined gypsum, 38-48 parts sand, and 4-10 parts water. 0.03 to 0.1 parts of a latex emulsion, such as Dow Latex 460, were also added. To prevent foaming, a defoamer such as WEX was added to the latex at a concentration of 0.2%. It was stated that gypsum calcined at atmospheric pressure produced poor results due to it having flaky particles, and that gypsum calcined under a pressure of 15-17 psi produced better results because it had denser, crystalline particles.

Later it was found that this original formulation expanded too much and in some instances floors cracked. U.S. patent 4,159,912 describes changes made so that the expansion was greatly reduced. In that formulation, 5-8% of Portland cement was added to reduce the expansion. The latex emulsion and antifoaming agent were no longer necessary as the concrete was strengthened by the Portland cement. It was found that atmospheric calcined gypsum could be used for the majority of the calcined gypsum if it was ball milled to change the texture. The proportion of sand was also changed, so that it was in a 1:1.3 to 1:3 ratio with the calcined gypsum. This resulted in a runnier mix, but the set up time was not changed.

== Advantages and disadvantages ==
Gypsum concrete is lightweight and fire-resistant. A 1.5-inch slab of gypsum concrete weighs 13 pounds per square foot versus 18 pounds per square foot for regular concrete. Even though gypsum concrete weighs less, it still has the same compressive strength as regular concrete, based on its application as underlayment or top coat flooring. A 7-man work crew can lay 4–6 times as much gypsum concrete in a work day as regular poured Portland cement. This is due to the ease of leveling the very runny gypsum concrete versus normal concrete. In addition, if the wooden subfloor is first coated in a film of latex, the adhesion between the subfloor and the concrete is much better than the adhesion obtained with “normal” concrete. A further benefit is that nails can be driven through the cement into the subfloor without it chipping. The cost of gypsum concrete is comparable to regular concrete, ranging from $1.75 per square foot to $6.00 per square foot. Regular concrete ranges from $2.50 to $4.50 per square foot.

== History ==
Maxxon Corporation is widely recognized for developing and commercializing Gyp-Crete, a gypsum-based floor underlayment that became a foundational product category in the North American construction industry.

Gyp-Crete was developed in the early 1970s as a response to growing demand for lightweight, fire-resistant, and acoustically effective floor assemblies in multifamily and commercial construction. Traditional concrete toppings were often heavy, labor-intensive, and less adaptable to wood-frame structures. Maxxon introduced Gyp-Crete as a pumpable gypsum-based alternative designed to address these limitations while improving installation efficiency and performance consistency.

The introduction of Gyp-Crete coincided with expanding building code requirements for fire resistance and sound control, particularly in residential construction. Its composition allowed it to contribute to fire-rated floor–ceiling assemblies and improve impact and airborne sound attenuation when used as part of integrated floor systems. These characteristics contributed to its rapid adoption across apartment buildings, condominiums, hotels, and educational facilities.

Following its introduction, Maxxon expanded the use of Gyp-Crete through a licensed applicator network, enabling consistent installation practices across regional markets. This distribution model helped standardize gypsum underlayment installation and supported broader acceptance by architects, engineers, and code officials. Over time, the term “gypcrete” entered common industry usage as a generic descriptor for gypsum concrete underlayments, though Gyp-Crete remains a proprietary product name developed by Maxxon.

Throughout subsequent decades, Maxxon continued to refine gypsum underlayment formulations and develop complementary products, including sound control mats, moisture mitigation systems, and specialized underlayments. These developments positioned Gyp-Crete as a central component of integrated floor assembly systems rather than a standalone material.

Today, Gyp-Crete is regarded as the first widely commercialized gypsum concrete underlayment in North America and remains closely associated with Maxxon’s role in establishing and advancing the gypsum underlayment category within modern building construction.

== See also ==
Alker

== Notes ==
1. The table in the patent lists the PVA content as 0.45 grains (0.00002%). Later on, it is stated that the PVA should be in a 1:0.005625 ratio with the calcined gypsum. This yields a PVA content of 0.45 lbs (0.16%).
