= Cas di torto =

Historic torto houses in Aruba

House of torto
- Cas di torto
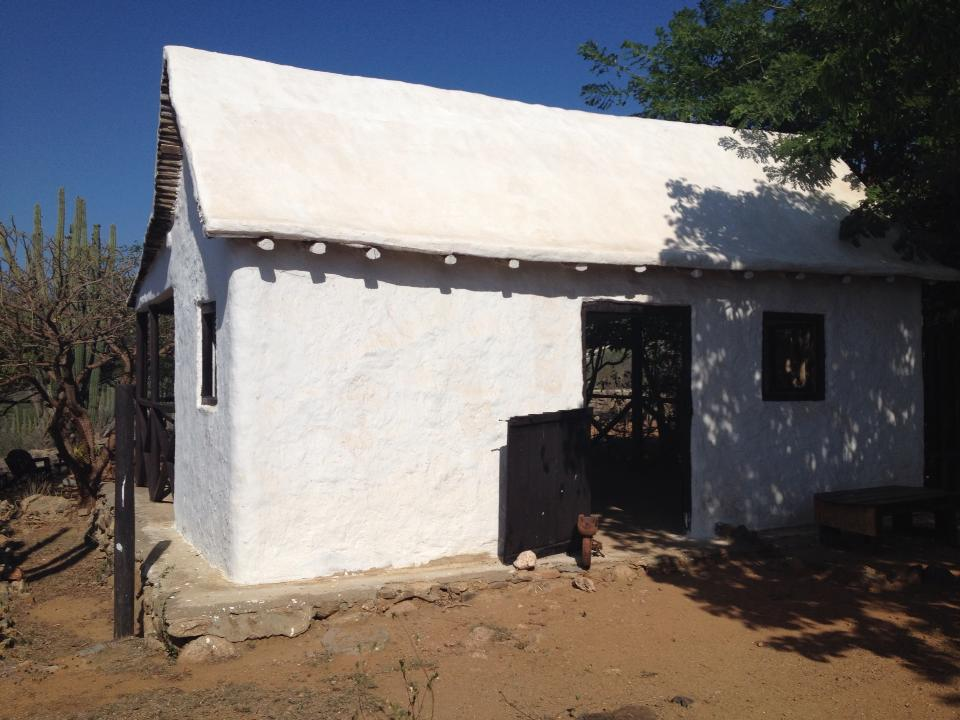
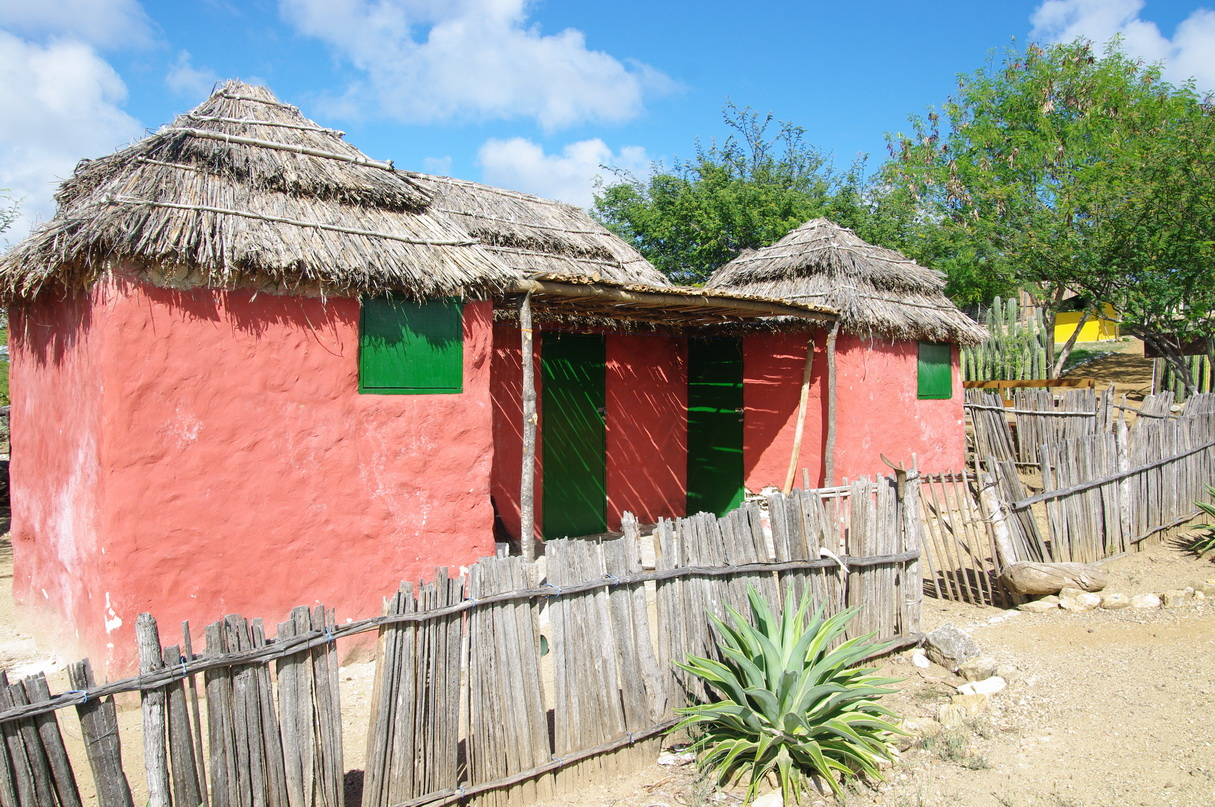
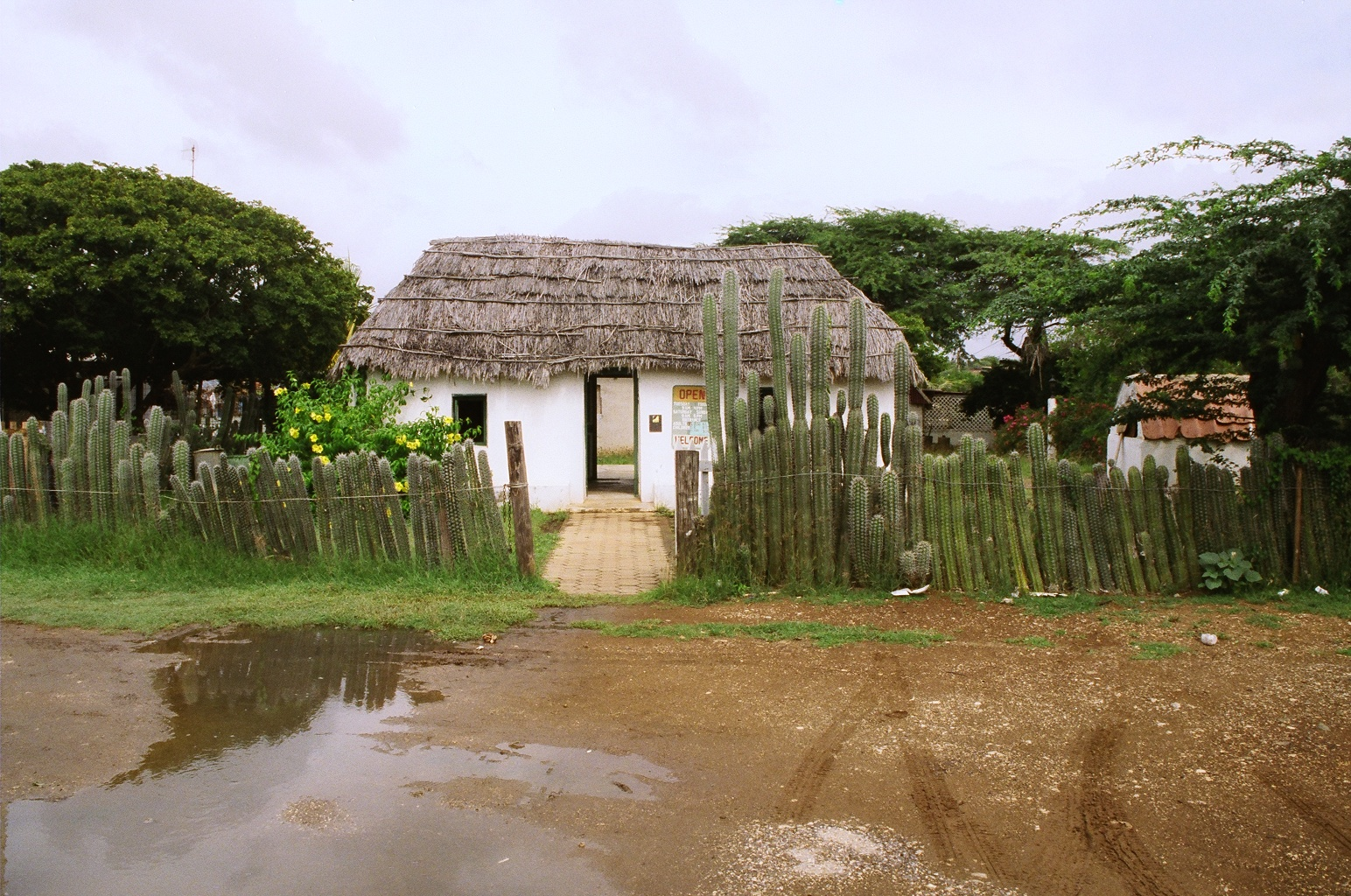
- Cas di torto or lodo in Arikok National Park Cas di bara in Rincon (Bonaire) Cas di yerba (house of straw) in Curaçao
- Alternative names: Cas di lodo Cas di bara

General information
- Location: Aruba; Bonaire; Curaçao

Height
- Roof: maiz stem cacti core straw

Technical details
- Floor count: 1

Cas di torto (also called cas di lodo "mud house" or cas di bara "house wit wooden posts") is a distinctive type of adobe house, specific to the insular region of Aruba, Bonaire, and Curaçao. These houses were usually found in the vicinity of plantations. The few structures that still exist are the oldest structures that are left standing on Aruba.

The name "cas di torto" likely originates from the Spanish "casas de torta," brought by settlers from the Paraguaná Peninsula in Venezuela to Aruba. "Torta" in Spanish means "cake" and references the layered clay construction.

== Overview ==
=== Geography ===
Aruba is the most westernmost island among the Leeward Antilles. It is located 26 kilometres (16 mi) off the coast of the Colombian Paraguana Peninsula in mainland South America. The island stretches approximately 30 kilometres (19 mi) in length and has a maximum width of 8 to 9 kilometres (5.0 to 5.6 mi). Aruba's southern coast is mostly flat and features sandy beaches. The northeastern part of the island consists of sparsely populated hilly terrain. The land gradually slopes down towards the southwest, forming flat plains that extend towards the sea.

On the northern coast, steep and rocky cliffs that are constantly battered by powerful waves due to the prevailing Northeast Trade Winds.

=== Climate ===
The climate of the Caribbean islands is classified as warm and humid. It is characterized by high levels of humidity throughout the year, including the dry season. There is only a slight difference between the daily maximum and minimum temperatures.

As a result of the relatively low and irregular rainfall, plant growth is limited in the Caribbean islands. The vegetation mainly comprises species that are capable of surviving the occasional long periods of drought, with cacti being a prominent example.

== History ==
Torto houses were the predominant type of dwelling from the seventeenth to the late nineteenth century, but their construction declined rapidly in the twentieth century. These torto houses are exceptionally cool and ideally suited to the local climate. This architectural style is believed to have originated from the Paraguaná Peninsula in Venezuela in the 18th century. The existing torto houses on Aruba date back approximately 150 years. Initially, many houses on the island were built using this construction method, but it fell out of use as cement became readily available. As of 2005, there were 62 torto houses remaining, with only four of them being in good condition.

== Construction and material ==
In the 17th and 18th centuries, only a small amount of building materials was transported from the Netherlands to Aruba. The majority of shipments from the Netherlands, often as ballast, were intended for Curaçao. As a result, local materials had to be relied upon. Initially, this mainly involved wood, clay, grass, and occasionally stone. It wasn't until after 1800 that stone houses began to appear more frequently alongside torto houses.

=== Walls ===
==== Wooden posts ====
Torto houses typically have a wooden interior structure for their walls. These walls are constructed using Y-shaped posts planted at a distance of approximately 60 centimetres (2.0 ft) from each other. Builders would scout the surrounding area for mostly straight tree trunks of sufficient length, primarily from a kwihi tree (Prosopis juliflora). However, finding straight and large kwihi trees was challenging as they were scarce. As a result, builders would settle for finding the minimum required length of suitable trunks. Consequently, the length of these wooden posts varied based on the size of the occupants.

The kwihi wood is shaped into rounded poles to ensure they are as straight as possible. Occasionally, green wood is used, which increases the chance of the posts taking root and enhances stability.

==== Interwoven branches ====
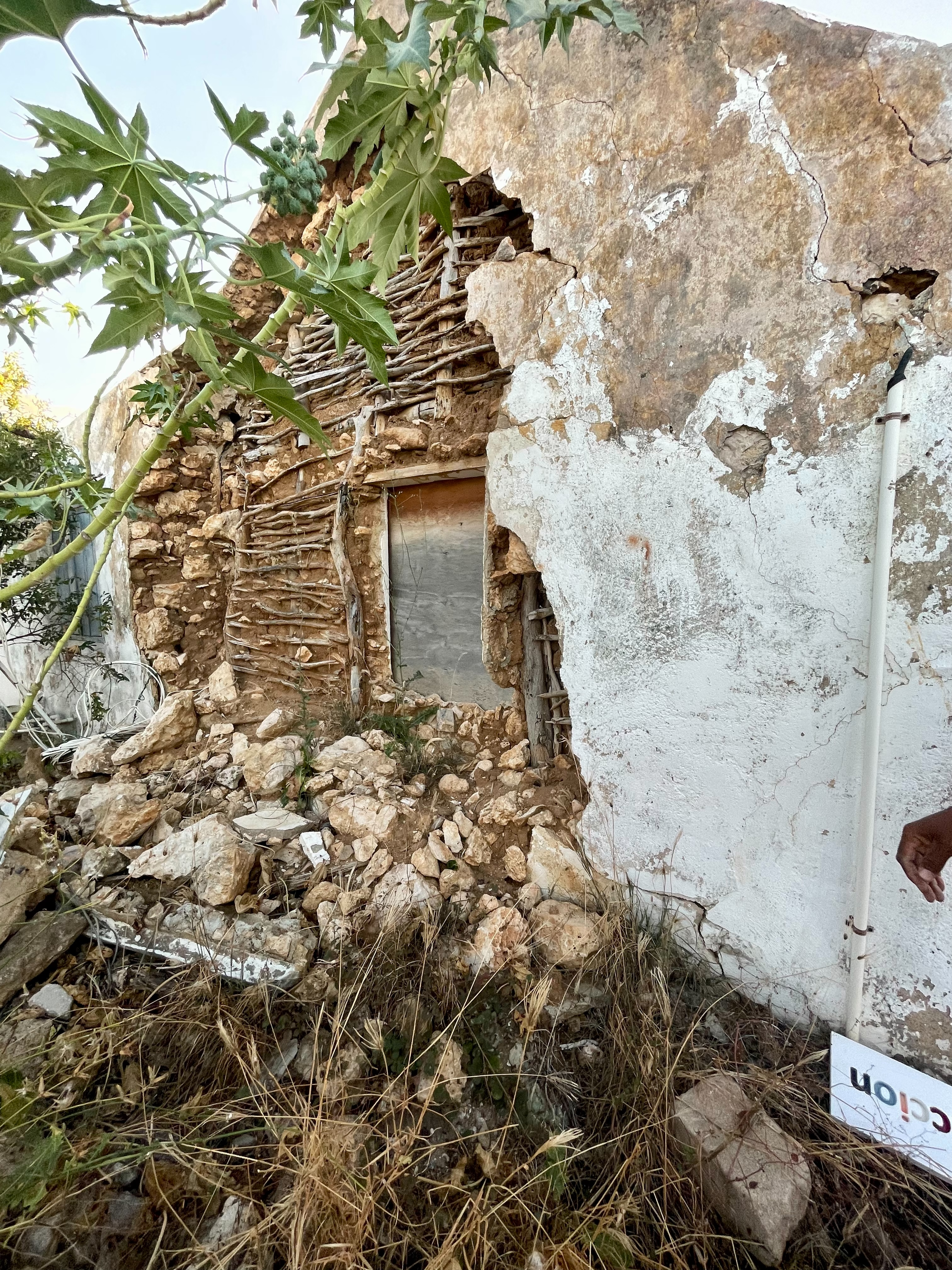
Exposed weaved structured of torto walls (Rancho, Aruba)

The gaps between these posts were densely woven with branches, approximately 2.5 centimetres (0.98 in) thick, without any additional attachments. The main types of wood used for this purpose are the mata di Mangel or mangrove trees (Laguncularia racemosa) but kwihi wood was also utilized. Aruba has four types of mangrove trees: Mangel tam (Rhizophora mangel ), Mangel preto (Avicennia germinans), Mangel shimaron (Laguncularia racemosa), and Fofoti (Conocarpus erectus). These mangroves account for less than 2% of Aruba's overall vegetation and have been a protected plant species. 26 July is recognized as International Day of Mangrove Trees.

To establish a stronger connection with the posts, green branches are used since they contract during the drying process. At times, these branches are secured using fibers from a creeping plant called Warero (Cissus verticillata) or from the Sisal plant (agave sislana) to enhance their durability. The weaving was then sealed on two sides with this so-called, torto, composed of loam mixed with dried fibers of para grass. Once dried, the walls were finished by applying a layer of white lime. Sometimes, a yellow color was achieved by incorporating ochre to the lime paste. Aloe sap was also added to this mixture to enhance the lime layer's resistance to weather conditions. The floors were covered with a layer of torto, preferably blended with the traditional cement of old times, namely cow dung.

Warero

Ken di nos no conoce?
E mondi di cadushi rencona pa cabuya y foyo
di Warero.
Nos desendiente mes por a admire.
Pa e mondi un compajero.
Unda cu bo pasa djis hisa bo cara y den
biento ariba e cadushi halto e ta saluda contento.

Awor ya mi ta un biehita i ta corda cada bes
Con un biaha mi welita a para sagudi cabes
Ami na su man teni a puntra kico e di?
Wel esey ta mi abuelo a jama e planchi ey Warero.

Y for di tanto tempo pasa
E ta semper na cadushi bon braza
Esey nos por yama bon amigo
Ami y mi abuelita ta testigo

Sra. Rosa. W. Maduro, Warero

Who of us don't know?
The cacti wilderness covered with ropes and foliage of Warero.
Our ancestors themselves could admire it
For the wilderness a companion.
Wherever you go just look up and in the
wind above, the tall cactus greets happily.

Now that I'm an old woman I keep remembering
How one time my grandmother stood and shook her head
Me, holding her hand, asked what she said?
Well that's my grandfather, who named that plant Warero.

And from that time on
It always embraced the cactus
That, we can call, a good friend
Me and my grandmother can testify to that

Mrs. Rosa. W. Maduro, Warero

=== Roof ===
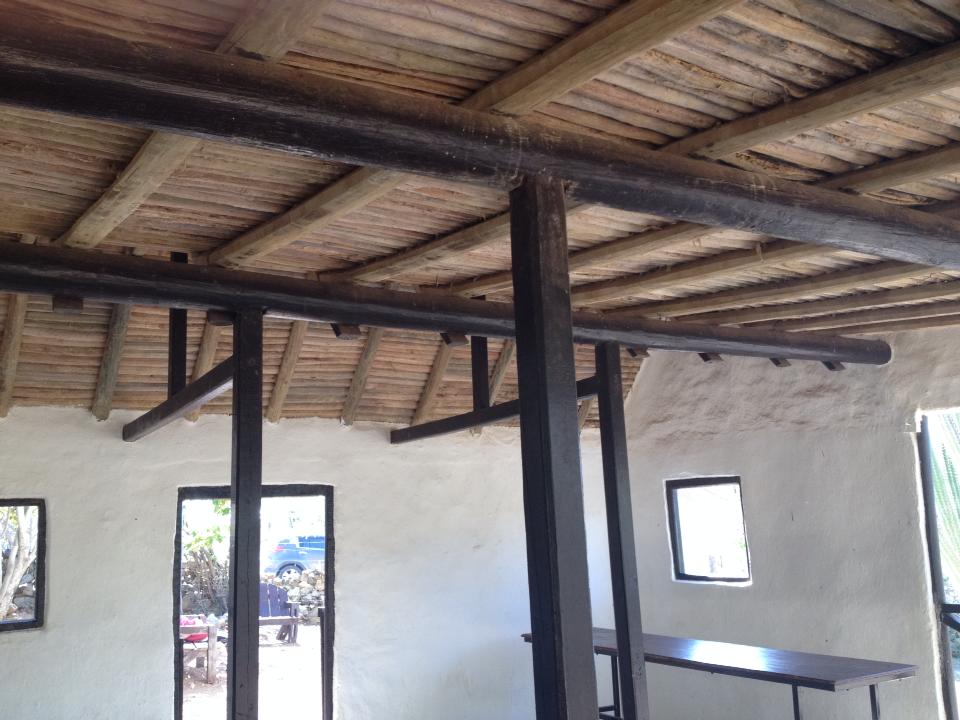
Interior view of torto roof (Arikok National Park, Aruba)

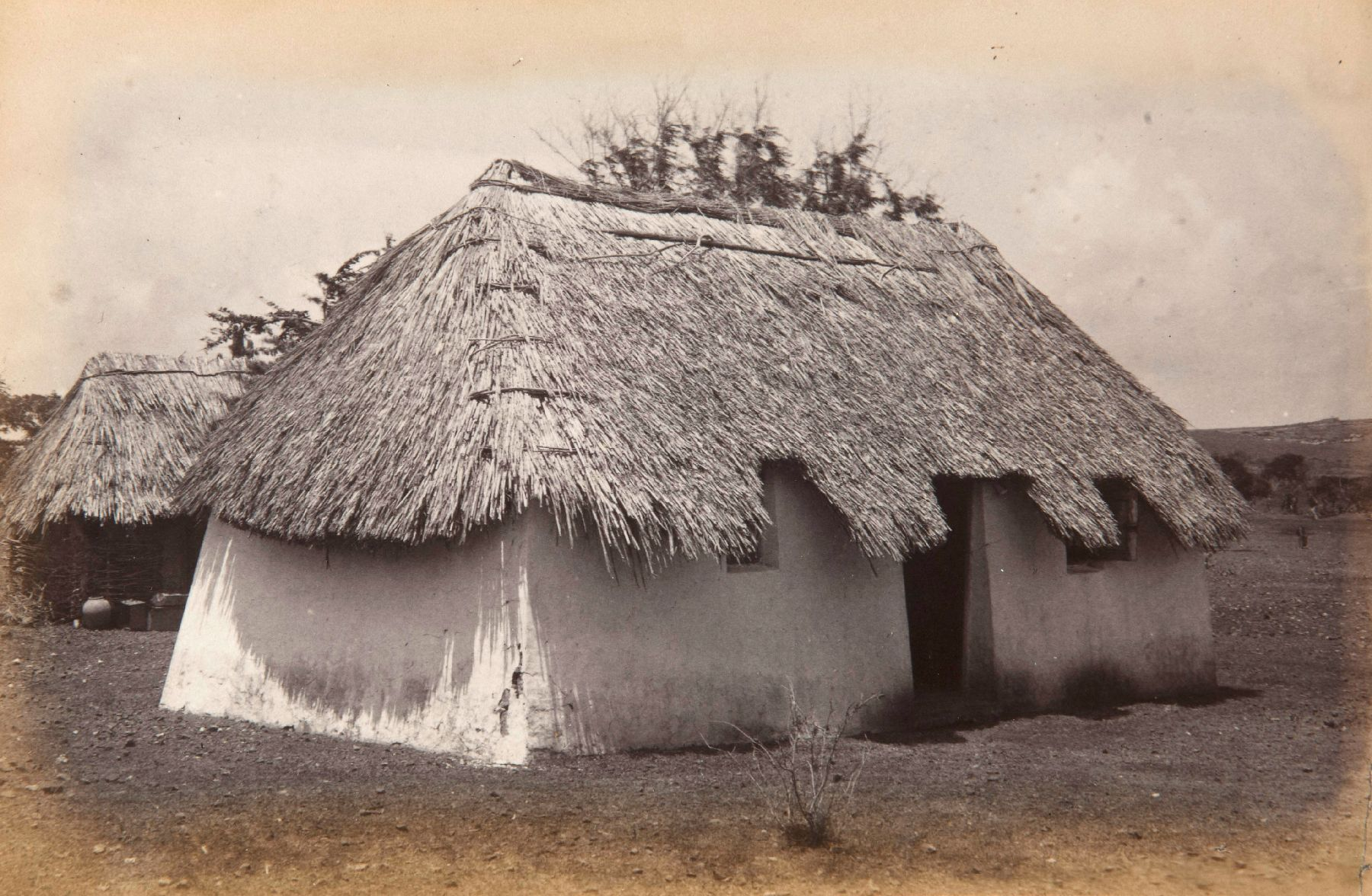
Straw roofing (Curaçao)

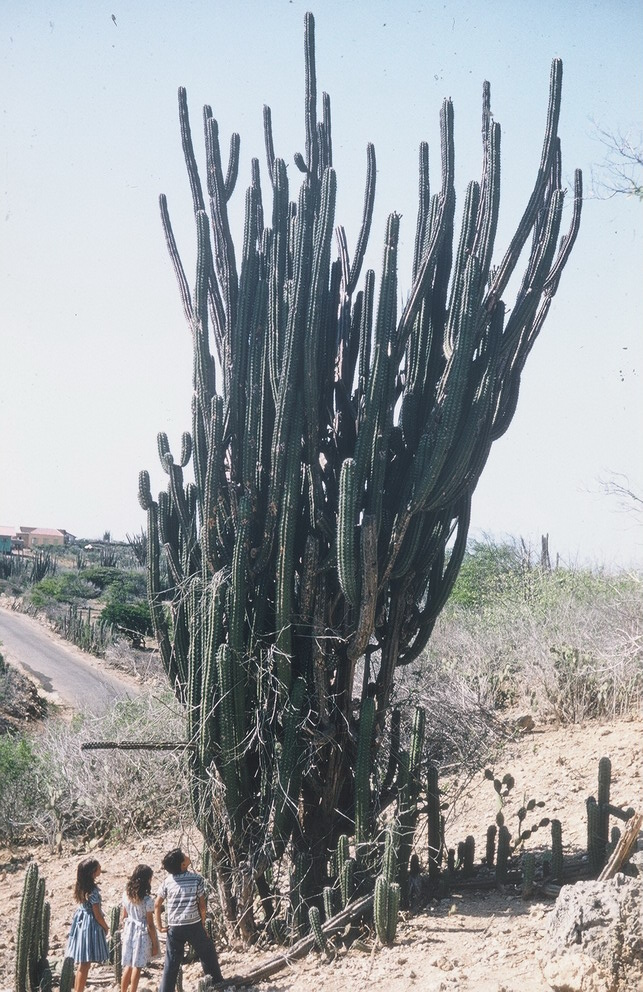
Candelabra cactus (Cereus repandus) circa 12 meters tall

Wood pieces are placed atop of the poles to support the roof beams. Roofs were commonly constructed using maishi chiki (Sorghum bicolor), signalgrass (Brachiaria mollis), palmtree leaves (Arecaceae), or maize stems, locally referred to as chosa (before c. 1815). This type of roofing is still found in Curaçao and Bonaire. Another method of roofing came in fashion in Aruba (after c. 1815), namely the whitening of these torto roofs. This method appears to have been introduced by groups of Spanish refugees who were expelled from Venezuela during the Venezuelan War of Independence and settled in Aruba. These turtle-shaped roofs completely replaced the roofs covered with maize stems and are unique to these islands. To support the roof, roof rafters were installed on each pair of wall uprights, with a ridge height of approximately 1.20 metres (3.9 ft) and a roof pitch of around 50°. Fibrous skeletal strips of the candelabra cactus (Cereus repandus) were utilized as roofing material. These cacti strips were either directly attached one by one to the rafters or first bound together with rope to create mats, which were then secured to the roof rafters. The outer surface of this cacti roofing was finished with the same torto used for the walls, and a final layer of white lime was applied.

Deze worden vuur- en waterproof daken genoemd; doch zijn het, wat het laatste aangaat, niet; want ik heb dikwijls, bij een zware regen, het water, gemengd met klei, langs de muren in het huis zien loopen.

These are called fireproof and waterproof roofs; however, in regard to the latter, they are not; because I have often seen, during heavy rain, water mixed with clay running along the walls into the house.

— Bosch, G.B., Reizen in het West-Indie en door een gedeelte van Zuid-en Noord Amerika II

=== Windows and doors ===
Windows were installed exclusively in the long walls and consisted of shutters measuring approximately 40 by 80 centimetres (1.3 ft × 2.6 ft), made of cactus wood. The door, measuring approximately 65 by 180 centimetres (2.13 ft × 5.91 ft), consisted of a lower and upper section known as the porta di saja cu djeki or "skirt and jacket door" (Dutch door).

=== House layout ===
In its simplest form, this type of housing included a single living area and a sleeping quarter separated by a partition wall reaching the height of the wall plate. People would sleep in hammocks hung from the roof structure, but there were no sanitary facilities available.

Cooking was done outdoors over an open fire. To expand on this basic torto house, a covered enclosure was added on the south side of the cottage. Part of this expansion, specifically the southwestern section, was designated as the kitchen. In one corner of this space, a water storage area was built. It consisted of a sturdy wall made of torto enclosing a wooden or metal water tank, designed to keep the family's water supply as cool as possible. The water was sourced from small lakes called tanki's, which collected rainwater.

The kitchen was equipped with a fireplace located against the western wall of the extension. This fireplace featured a raised fire pit, about 85 centimetres (2.79 ft) above the floor, completely surrounded by walls. The walls were slanted and ended in a smoke ventilation channel.

By placing the fireplace against the western wall, the natural airflow generated by the trade winds effectively carried the smoke away, ensuring minimal inconvenience to the residents. To prevent soot buildup in the chimney, a clay cap was often installed on the smoke channel. This cap was designated to prevent wind from entering the chimney while allowing the smoke to escape in the opposite direction.

== Documentary ==
In 2022, Aruba Heritage Foundation released a documentary called "Casnan di Torto na Aruba" (Torto Houses in Aruba), which shed light on the traditional building methods of these houses.

== Sources ==
- Bosch, G.B. (1836). Reizen in West-indië en door een gedeelte van Zuid-en Noord-Amerika 2de deel (in Dutch). Utrecht: L.E. Bosch.
- "Warero: Revista di centro di bario Brazil" [Warero: Magazine of Brazil residents]. Centro di Bario Brazil (in Papiamento). No. 1. 1977.
- Government Aruba (2017). "AB2017No.48". Government Aruba (in Dutch).
- Nijdam, Th. (1967). Het woonhuis op Aruba: vanaf de tijden der Indianen to heden.
- Rosenstand, A.S. (1986). Het Arubaanse Kunukuhuis: bouwwijze en typische eigenshappen (Thesis) (in Dutch). Delft: Technische Hogeschool Delft.
- Willemsen, M. (2011). Vegetatiekatering in het nationaal park Arikok te Aruba (PDF). www.dcbd.nl (Report) (in Dutch). Arikok National Park.
