= Cast Earth =

Building material

Cast Earth is a proprietary natural building material developed since the mid-1990s by Harris Lowenhaupt and Michael Frerking based on the earlier Turkish Alker, which is a concrete-like composite with soil of a suitable composition as its bulk component stabilized with about 15% calcined gypsum (plaster of Paris) instead of Portland cement. It can be used to form solid walls that need not be reinforced with a steel frame or timber framing, unless extra seismic reinforcement is necessary. Forms are set up and filled with Cast Earth, which sets quickly and solidly. Once the forms are removed the wall stays sound.

Cast Earth is often promoted as an environmentally friendly alternative to cast concrete. The Cast Earth slurry is poured in forms similar to concrete construction and is a suitable alternative to concrete walls in areas prone to hurricane damage. The technology has the potential to be able to compete against traditional wood-frame construction in terms of cost. Cast Earth can also be installed with a lot less labor than most green alternatives, such as rammed earth. Since the product is proprietary, installation requires a crew trained by the Cast Earth company, leaving it out of reach of do-it-yourself builders. It is also not cost-effective for contractors unless they do a lot of Cast Earth installations.

The calcined gypsum sets quickly. When calcined gypsum is added to soil, the setting time is reduced even further, to mere minutes. Often this quick setting is too fast and a retardant must be added to the mix so it can be poured. In Alker, lime is added to extend working time to 20 minutes. Cast Earth uses another retardant for an even greater working time. This ingredient is proprietary and a carefully guarded secret. When the material is dry, it is similar to adobe in various ways, outperforming it in tensile strength, hardness, and erosion resistance. It also has less tendency to crack and shrink. Some Cast Earth walls do soak up water, however, depending upon the porosity of the earthen materials used. For example, decomposed granite tends to be prone to absorption if the eaves of the roof is inadequate or it is exposed to water for a prolonged time, i.e. days. Limestone materials however, tend to repel water once the walls are completely dried/cured.
