= Bassanite =

Calcium sulfate mineral

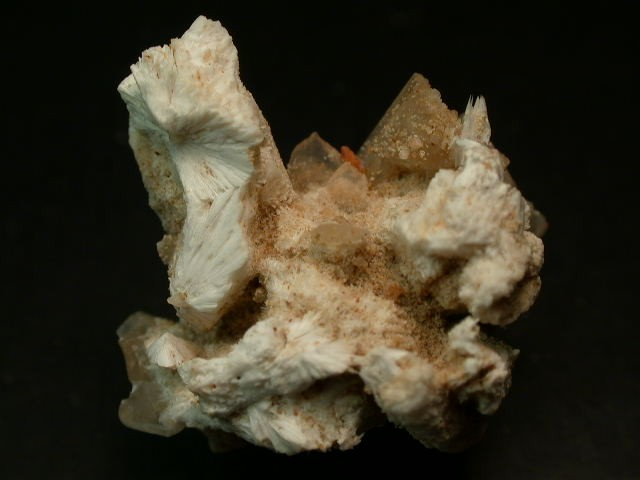
- White radial-acicular bassanite crystals from Kimba, Eyre Peninsula, South Australia

General
- Category: Sulfate mineral
- Formula: CaSO_{4}·1/2H_{2}O
- IMA symbol: Bss
- Strunz classification: 7.CD.45
- Crystal system: Monoclinic
- Space group: C2 (No. 5)
- Unit cell: a = 12.0317 Å, b = 6.9269 Å, c = 12.6712 Å, β = 90.27°; Z = 12

Identification
- Color: White
- Crystal habit: Microscopic acicular crystals in parallel aggregates, pseudohexagonal
- Twinning: Twin plane {101}
- Luster: Earthy
- Streak: White
- Diaphaneity: Semitransparent
- Specific gravity: 2.69–2.76
- Optical properties: Biaxial (+)
- Refractive index: n_{α} = 1.550–1.559, n_{β} = 1.560, n_{γ} = 1.577–1.584
- 2V angle: 10–15°
- Alters to: Dehydrates on heating to anhydrite

Bassanite is a sulfate mineral composed of calcium sulfate hemihydrate, with the chemical formula CaSO_{4}·0.5H_{2}O or 2CaSO_{4}·H_{2}O. It has half a water molecule per CaSO_{4} unit.

Bassanite was first described in 1910 for an occurrence on Mount Vesuvius. It was named for Italian paleontologist Francesco Bassani (1853–1916).

At Vesuvius it occurs as alterations from gypsum within leucite tephrite and as fumarole deposits. It occurs in dry lake beds in California and Australia. It also occurs interlayered with gypsum in caves.

H. Schmidt and coinvestigators reported in 2011 that under dry conditions, the structure is monoclinic with space group C2, but at 75% humidity, the structure is trigonal with space group P3_{2}21. This reflects the incorporation of additional water of hydration, such that the trigonal form has the formula CaSO_{4}·0.625H_{2}O.
