= Alker =

Earth-based stabilized building material

Alker is an earth-based stabilized building material produced by the addition of gypsum, lime, and water to earth with the appropriate granulometric structure and with a cohesive property. Unbaked and produced on-site either as adobe blocks or by pouring into mouldings (the rammed earth technique), it has significant economical and ecological advantages. Its physical and mechanical properties are superior to traditional earth construction materials, and are comparable to other stabilized earthen materials. The ratios of the mixture are determined in accordance with the purpose of construction. Alker has primarily been used as a wall construction material; for this purpose, the addition of 8-10% gypsum, 2.5-5% lime, and 20% water to earth produces optimum results. These ratios may change according to the nature and content of clay in the soil.

== Research ==
The initial research for Alker was completed in 1980 at the Faculty of Architecture of Istanbul Technical University. The word Alker is an abbreviation combining the first syllables of the Turkish words for Gypsum (Alçı) and Adobe (Kerpiç). Alker was inspired by a traditional plaster material consisting of a mixture of earth, gypsum and lime, which has been in use in the earthen architecture of Anatolia since the Neolithic era due to its high water resistance. The initial project for Alker was based on the addition only of gypsum to earth with the appropriate qualities. The addition of lime was introduced later, and improved the material's earthquake resistant properties. Research on the properties and application methods of Alker has continued, mainly at Istanbul Technical University.

Alker has been used in numerous constructions in Turkey, where it was first developed, as well as in other countries. One of the earliest among these, constructed in 1995 in Istanbul Technical University's Ayazağa Campus, has been in continuous use without needing significant repair. In this particular construction process, the material was poured into mouldings and rammed, with a view to exploring possibilities for mass construction with Alker.

== Properties ==
Alker is characterized by its quick setting time (approximately 20 minutes), hence preventing clay shrinkage and eliminating the need for curing and drying processes. If needed, a retarding agent may be added to the mixture. It is a porous material with a lower volumetric weight, and nearly four times more pressure resistance as compared to traditional earthen wall materials. Structurally, Alker is comparable to concrete as a conglomerate material. While properties of concrete improve in direct ratio to the amount of cement it contains, increased amounts of clay (the binding element) in the Alker mixture have negative effects on its physical properties, particularly in terms of pressure and erosion resistance.

Alker exhibits high resistance to water-related erosion, in contrast to traditional unbaked earthen building materials which are characterized by poor resistance to water. In erosion tests, pure earthen materials completely dissolve; the erosion rate in Alker is minimal. The material gains a rigidity of 0.375 MPa during the setting process, within the first twenty minutes after pouring. It gains rigidity while containing 20% moisture, which makes it possible to remove mouldings and stack blocks shortly after pouring the material.

Its unit weight is lower than that of comparable building materials. Its shrinkage and expansion rates are low, comparable to those of concrete. As such, it can be poured continuously without necessitating a contraction joint. It is characterized by resistance to water and moisture. The ratio of lime in the mixture can be modified to eliminate water-related erosion. Experiments on capillary water absorption have shown that increased amounts of lime in the mixture results in an increase in quantity and in reduced width of capillary canals, proving the material's erosion resistance. Compressive and shear strength and modules of elasticity and rigidity present advantages in earthquake resistance. Once the mixture is poured into a mould, the production process is completed, and a significant degree of rigidity is reached. It does not require curing and drying, providing economy of time, labor, and energy. Its resistance to pressure is 3,5 - 4 MPa. The lime in the mixture reduces resistance to pressure to a minimal degree, while increasing elasticity and resistance to impact. During pressure tests, cube-shaped blocks fracture in pyramidal forms, comparable to concrete blocks, and do not disintegrate in the way unstabilized earthen blocks do.

Alker is not a patented material. It has been developed with the aim of creating a widely used low-cost Ecological Building material available for self-building, as well as for larger, sustainable architecture projects. A number of projects have been developed that are based on Alker (gypsum- and lime-stabilized earth) technology. Among these is cast earth, which uses the Alker mixture with the addition of a retarding agent in order to lengthen the setting time. If Alker is to be produced on the construction site, addition of a retarding agent is unnecessary.

Stabilization of earth with only gypsum addition does not produce material with the same physical and mechanical properties as that with lime and gypsum addition, and increased amounts of gypsum result in raised costs.
