= Adobe =

Building material of earth and organic materials

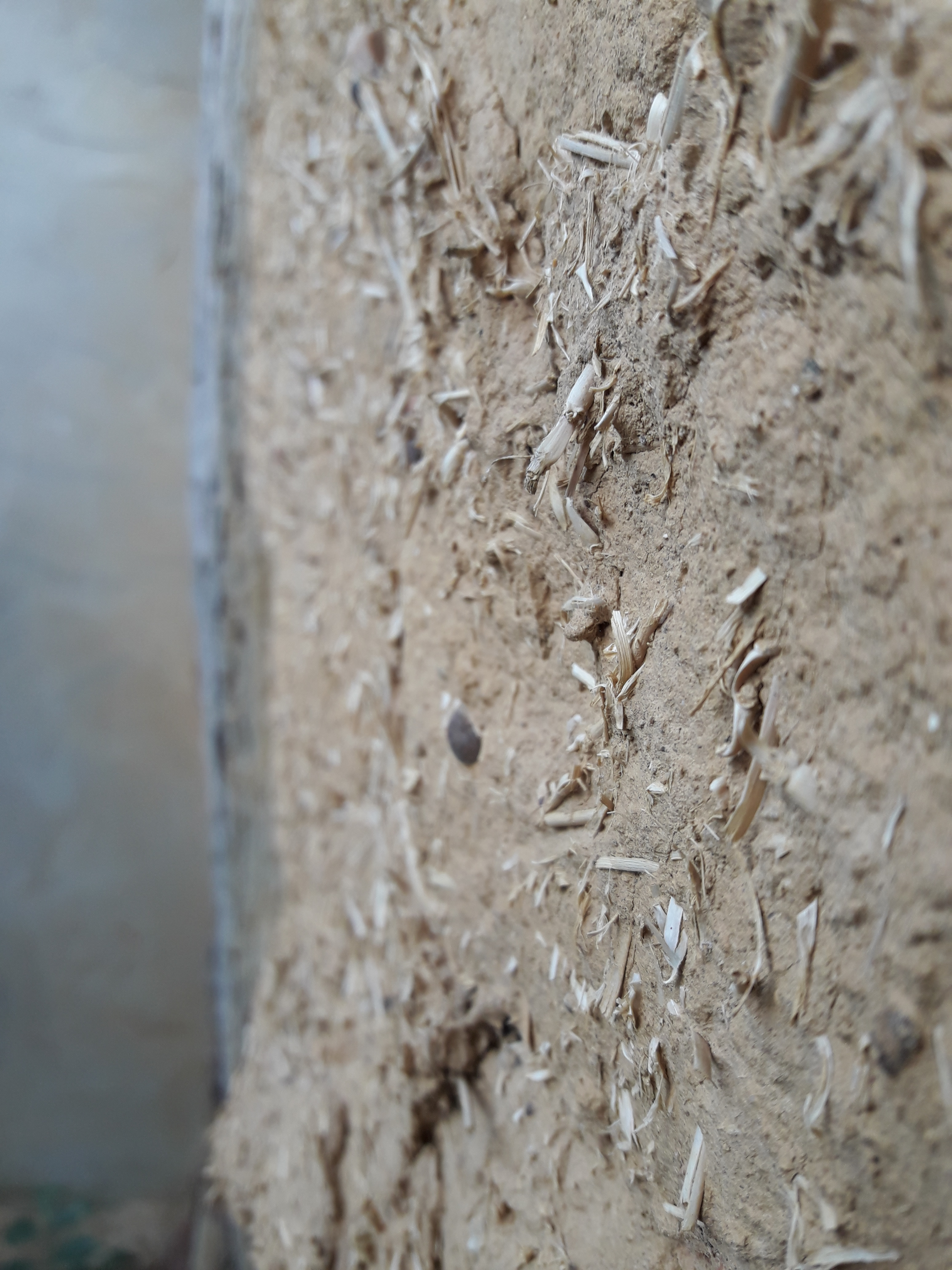
Adobe wall (detail) in Bahillo, Palencia, Spain

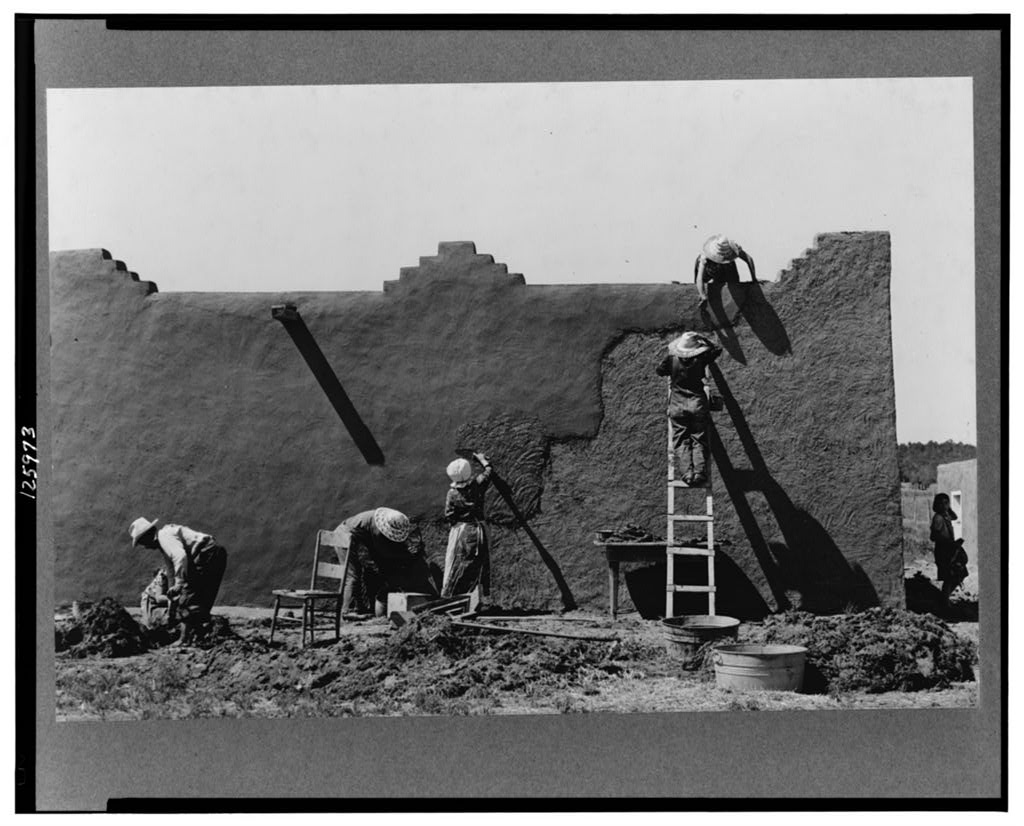
Renewal of the surface coating of an adobe wall in Chamisal, New Mexico

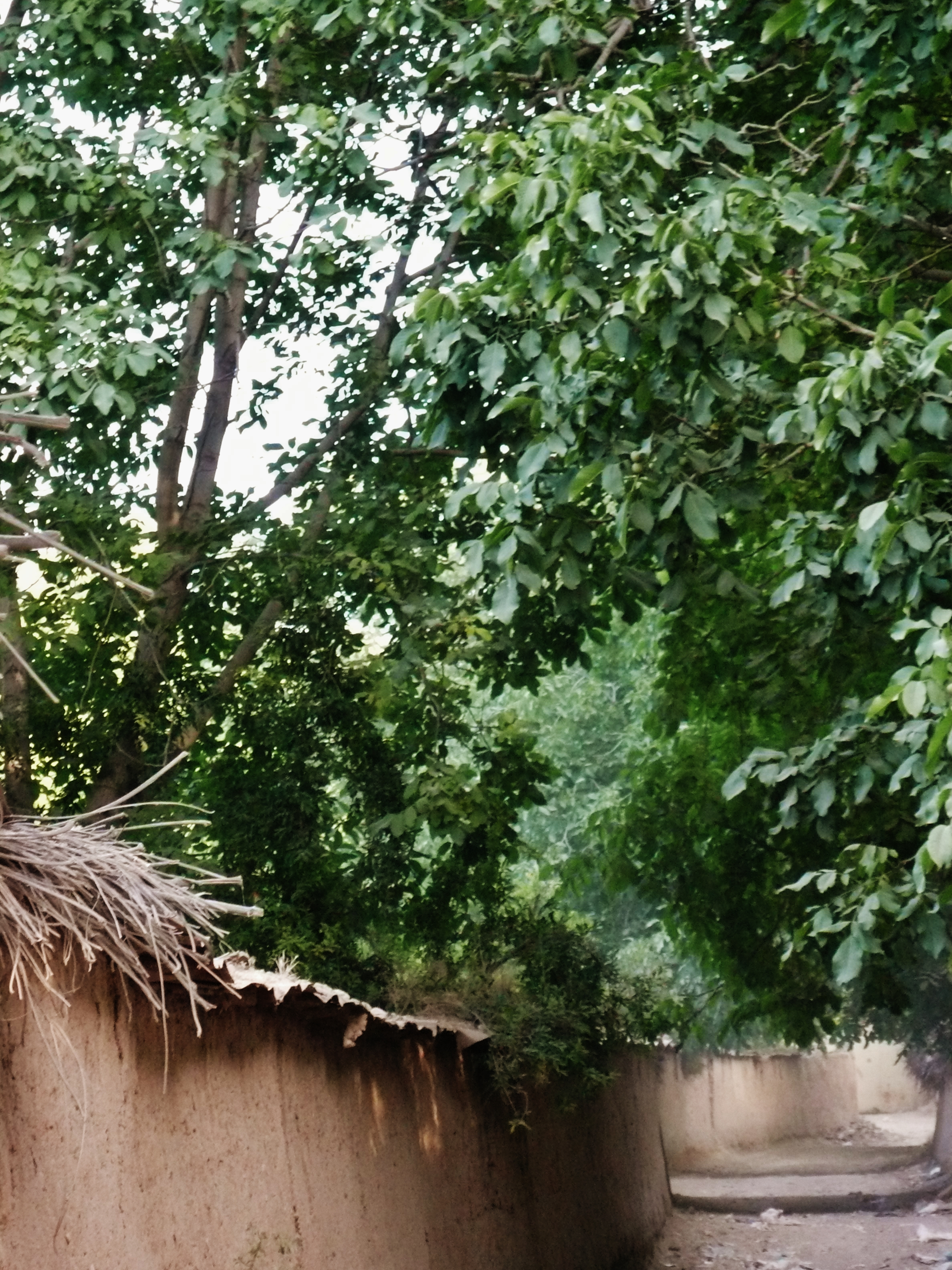
Adobe walls separate urban gardens in Shiraz, Iran

Adobe (/əˈdoʊbi/ ə-DOH-bee; Spanish: [aˈðoβe]; via Spanish, from Arabic الطّوب (at-tūb)) is a building material made from loam and organic materials. Adobe is Spanish for mudbrick.

In some English-speaking regions of Spanish heritage, such as the Southwestern United States, the term is used to refer to any kind of earthen construction, or various architectural styles like Pueblo Revival or Territorial Revival. Most adobe buildings are similar in appearance to cob and rammed earth buildings.

Adobe is among the earliest building materials and is used throughout the world. Adobe architecture has been dated to before 5,100 BP.

== Description ==
Adobe bricks are rectangular prisms small enough that they can quickly air dry individually without cracking. They can be subsequently assembled, with the application of adobe mud to bond the individual bricks into a structure. There is no standard size, with substantial variations over the years and in different regions. In some areas a popular size measured 20 cm × 10 cm × 30 cm (8 by 4 by 12 inches) weighing about 10 kg (25 pounds); in other contexts the size is 25 cm × 10 cm × 36 cm (10 by 4 by 14 inches), weighing about 15 kg (35 pounds). The maximum sizes can reach up to 45 kg (100 pounds); above this weight it becomes difficult to move the pieces, and it is preferred to ram the mud in situ, resulting in a different typology known as rammed earth.

== Strength ==
In dry climates, adobe structures are extremely durable, and account for some of the oldest existing buildings in the world. Adobe buildings offer significant advantages due to their greater thermal mass, but they are known to be particularly susceptible to earthquake damage if they are not reinforced. Cases where adobe structures were widely damaged during earthquakes include the 1976 Guatemala earthquake, the 2003 Bam earthquake, and the 2010 Chile earthquake.

== Distribution ==
Buildings made of sun-dried earth are common throughout the world (Middle East, Western Asia, North Africa, West Africa, South America, Southwestern North America, Southwestern and Eastern Europe.). Adobe had been in use by indigenous peoples of the Americas in the Southwestern United States, Mesoamerica, and the Andes for several thousand years. Puebloan peoples built their adobe structures with handfuls or basketsful of adobe, until the Spanish introduced them to making bricks. Adobe bricks were used in Spain from the Late Bronze and Iron Ages (eighth century BCE onwards). Its wide use can be attributed to its simplicity of design and manufacture, and economics.

== Etymology ==
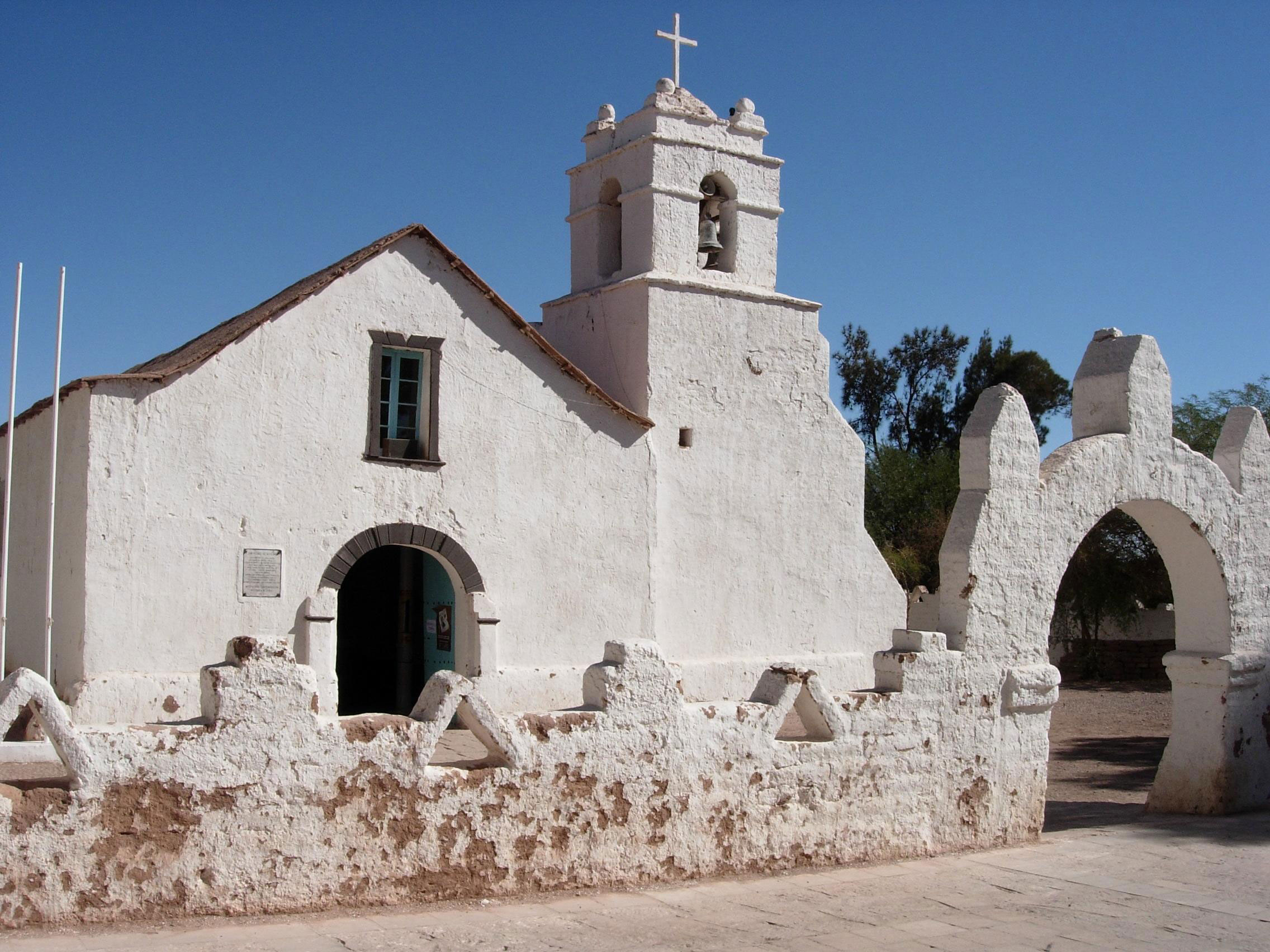
Church at San Pedro de Atacama, Chile

The word adobe /əˈdoʊbiː/ has existed for around 4,000 years with relatively little change in either pronunciation or meaning. The word can be traced from the Middle Egyptian (c. 2000 BC) word ḏbt "mud brick" (with vowels unwritten). Middle Egyptian evolved into Late Egyptian and finally to Coptic (c. 600 BC), where it appeared as ⲧⲱⲃⲉ tōbə. This was adopted into Arabic as الطوب aṭ-ṭawbu or aṭ-ṭūbu, with the definite article al- attached to the root tuba. This was assimilated into the Old Spanish language as adobe [aˈdobe], probably via Mozarabic. English borrowed the word from Spanish in the early 18th century, still referring to mudbrick construction.

In more modern English usage, the term adobe has come to include a style of architecture popular in the desert climates of North America, especially in New Mexico, regardless of the construction method.

== Composition ==
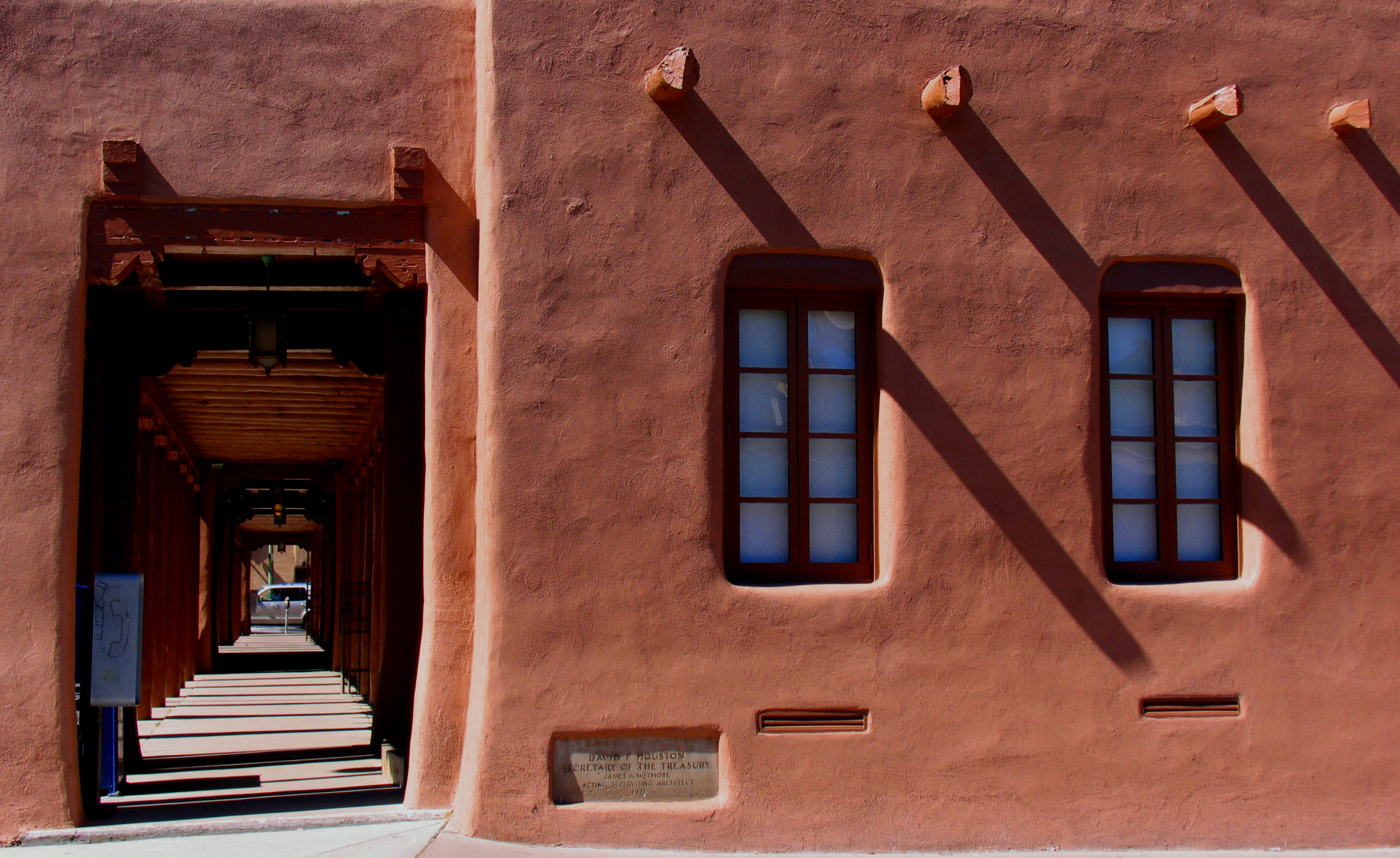
Adobe style in Santa Fe, New Mexico

An adobe brick is a composite material made of earth mixed with water and an organic material such as straw or dung. The soil composition typically contains sand, silt, and clay. Straw is useful in binding the brick together and allowing the brick to dry evenly, thereby preventing cracking due to uneven shrinkage rates through the brick; dung offers the same advantage. The most desirable soil texture for producing the mud of adobe is 15% clay, 10–30% silt, and 55–75% fine sand. Another source quotes 15–25% clay and the remainder sand and coarser particles up to cobbles 50 to 250 mm (2 to 10 in), with no deleterious effect. Modern adobe is stabilized with either emulsified asphalt or Portland cement up to 10% by weight.

No more than half the clay content should be expansive clays, with the remainder non-expansive Illite or Kaolinite. Too much expansive clay results in uneven drying through the brick, resulting in cracking, while too much Kaolinite will make a weak brick. Typically, the soils of the Southwest United States, where such construction has been widely used, are an adequate composition.

== Material properties ==
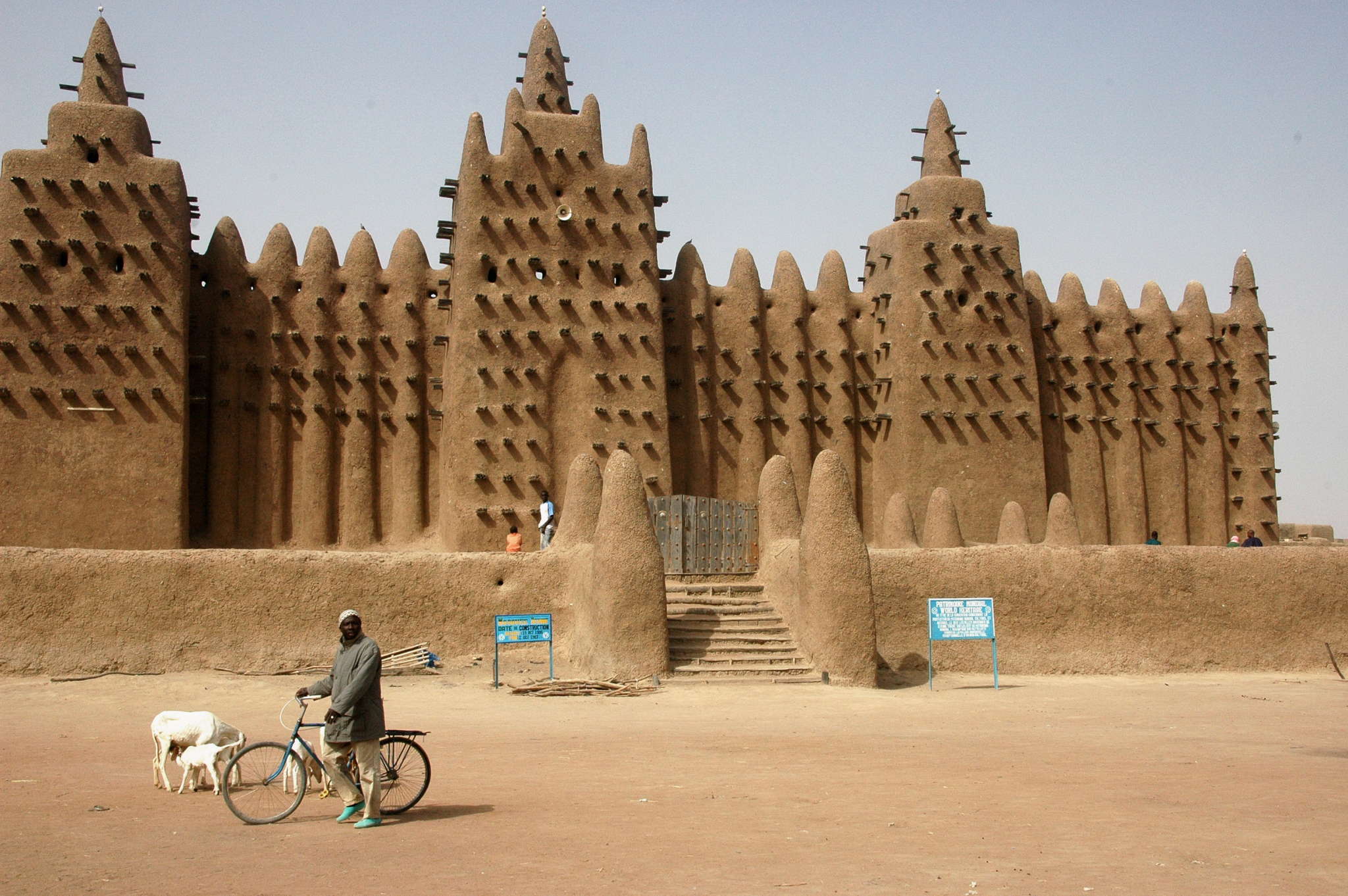
The Great Mosque of Djenné, Mali, built in adobe. The struts projecting from the wall serve as decoration, as well as supports for scaffolding during maintenance.

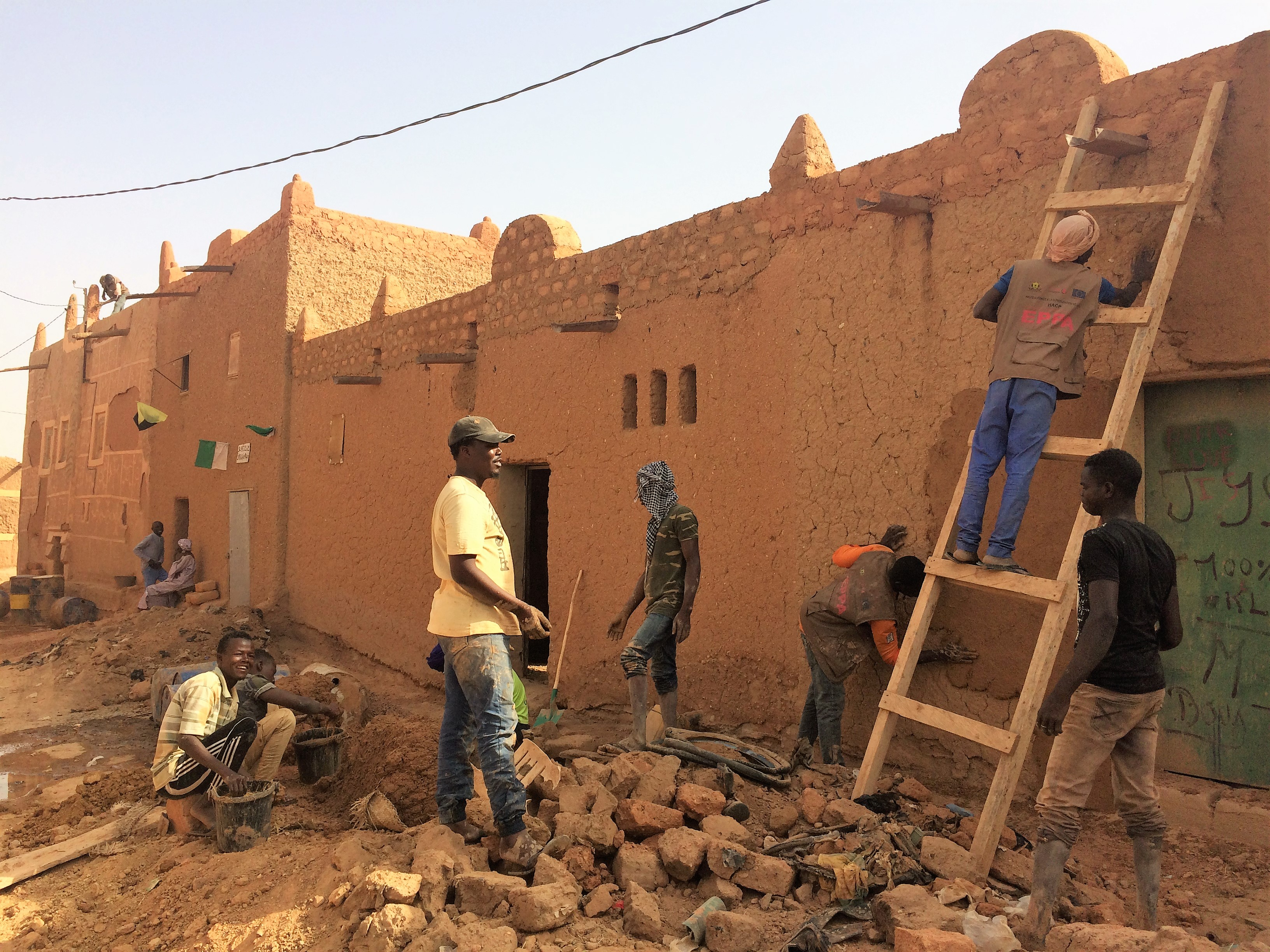
Maintenance of historic architecture in Agadez, Niger, by adding a new layer of mud rendering

Adobe walls are load bearing, meaning that they carry their own weight into the foundation rather than through another structure, hence the adobe must have sufficient compressive strength. In the United States, most building codes call for a minimum compressive strength of 2.1 N/mm^{2} (300 lbf/in^{2}) for the adobe block. Adobe construction should be designed so as to avoid lateral structural loads that would cause bending loads. The building codes require the building sustain a 1 gram (0.035 oz) lateral acceleration earthquake load. Such an acceleration will cause lateral loads on the walls, resulting in shear and bending and inducing tensile stresses. To withstand such loads, the codes typically call for a tensile modulus of rupture strength of at least 2.1 N/mm^{2} (300 lbf/in^{2}) for the finished block.

In addition to being an inexpensive material with a small resource cost, adobe can serve as a significant heat reservoir due to the thermal properties inherent in the massive walls typical in adobe construction. In climates typified by hot days and cool nights, the high thermal mass of adobe mediates the high and low temperatures of the day, moderating the temperature of the living space. The massive walls require a large and relatively long input of heat from the sun (radiation) and from the surrounding air (convection) before they warm through to the interior. After the sun sets and the temperature drops, the warm wall will continue to transfer heat to the interior for several hours due to the time-lag effect. Thus, a well-planned adobe wall of appropriate thickness is very effective at controlling inside temperature through the wide daily fluctuations typical of desert climates, a factor which has contributed to its longevity as a building material.

Thermodynamic material properties have significant variation in the literature. Some experiments suggest that the standard consideration of conductivity is not adequate for this material, as its main thermodynamic property is inertia, and conclude that experimental tests should be performed over a longer period of time than usual – preferably with changing thermal jumps. There is an effective R-value for a north facing 10-inch (25 cm) wall of R0=10 hr ft^{2} °F/Btu, which corresponds to thermal conductivity k=10 in x 1 ft/12 in /R0=0.33 Btu/(hr ft °F) or 0.57 W/(m K) in agreement with the thermal conductivity reported from another source. To determine the total R-value of a wall, scale R_{0} by the thickness of the wall in inches. The thermal resistance of adobe is also stated as an R-value for a 10-inch (25 cm) wall R_{0}=4.1 hr ft^{2} °F/Btu. Another source provides the following properties: conductivity 0.30 Btu/(hr ft °F) or 0.52 W/(m K); specific heat capacity 0.24 Btu/(lb °F) or 1 kJ/(kg K) and density 106 lb/cu ft (1,700 kg/m^{3}), giving heat capacity 25.4 Btu/(ft^{3} °F) or 1700 kJ/(m^{3} K). Using the average value of the thermal conductivity as k = 32 Btu/(hr ft °F) or 0.55 W/(m K), the thermal diffusivity is calculated to be 0.013 sq ft/h (3.4×10^{−7} m^{2}/s).

== Uses ==
=== Poured and puddled adobe walls ===
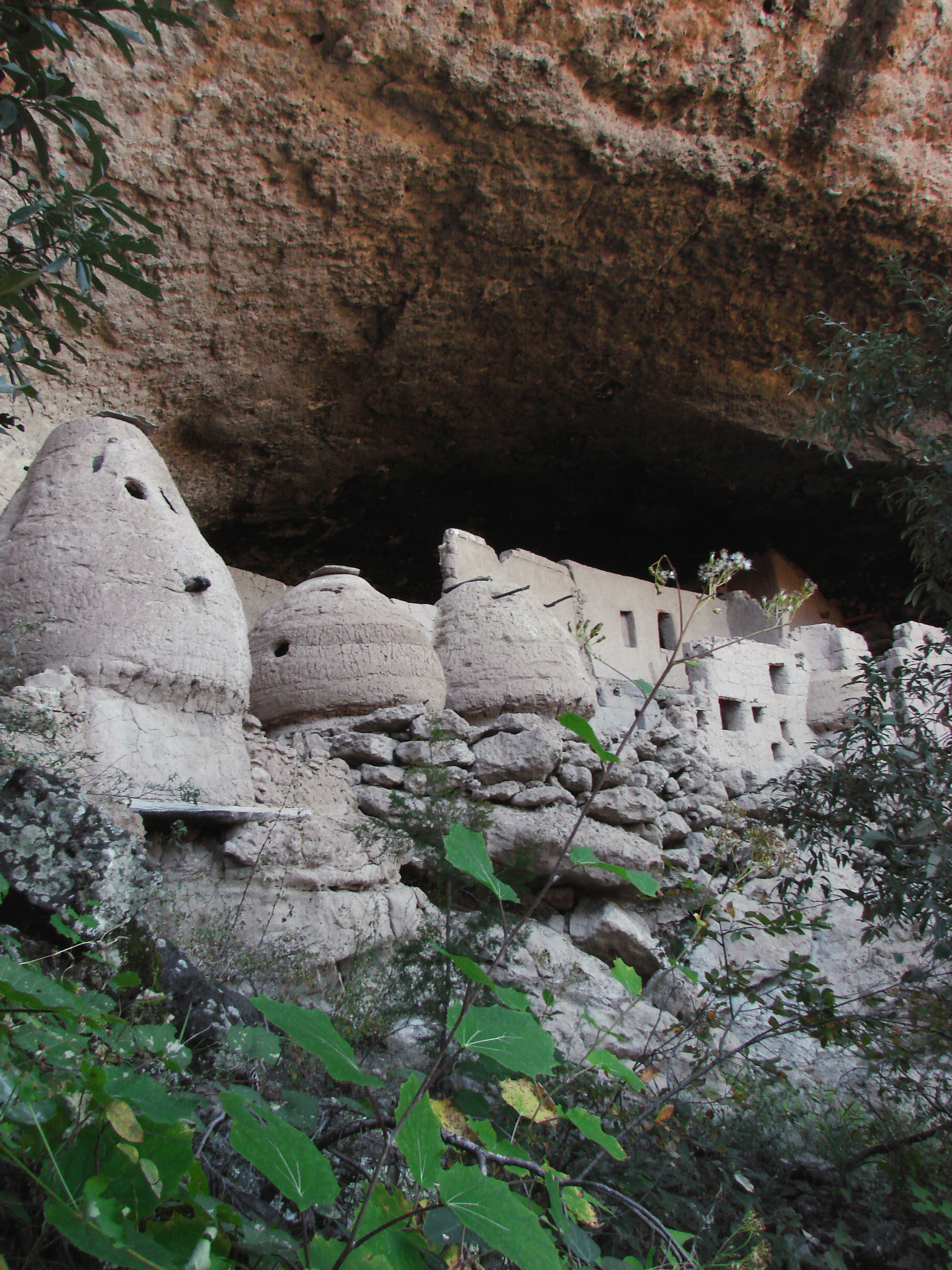
Cliff dwellings of poured or puddled adobe (cob) at Cuarenta Casas in Mexico

Poured and puddled adobe (puddled clay, piled earth), today called cob, is made by placing soft adobe in layers, rather than by making individual dried bricks or using a form. "Puddle" is a general term for a clay or clay and sand-based material worked into a dense, plastic state. These are the oldest methods of building with adobe in the Americas until holes in the ground were used as forms, and later wooden forms used to make individual bricks were introduced by the Spanish.

=== Adobe bricks ===
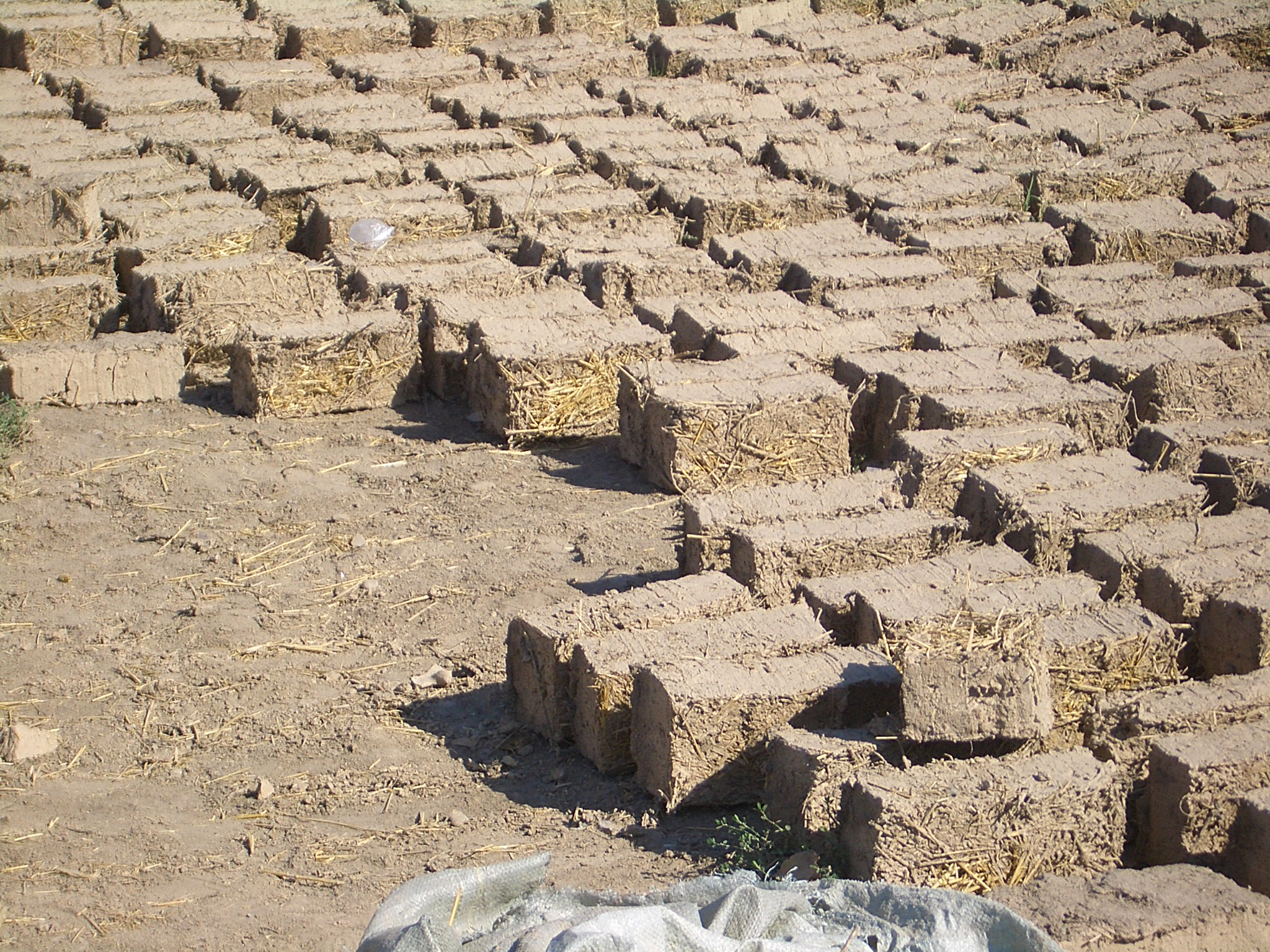
Adobe bricks near a construction site in Milyanfan, Kyrgyzstan

Bricks made from adobe are usually made by pressing the mud mixture into an open timber frame. In North America, the brick is typically about 25 by 36 cm (10 by 14 in) in size. The mixture is molded into the frame, which is removed after initial setting. After drying for a few hours, the bricks are turned on edge to finish drying. Slow drying in shade reduces cracking.

The same mixture, without straw, is used to make mortar and often plaster on interior and exterior walls. Some cultures used lime-based cement for the plaster to protect against rain damage.

Depending on the form into which the mixture is pressed, adobe can encompass nearly any shape or size, provided drying is even and the mixture includes reinforcement for larger bricks. Reinforcement can include manure, straw, cement, rebar, or wooden posts. Straw, cement, or manure added to a standard adobe mixture can produce a stronger, more crack-resistant brick. A test is done on the soil content first. To do so, a sample of the soil is mixed into a clear container with some water, creating an almost completely saturated liquid. The container is shaken vigorously for one minute. It is then allowed to settle for a day until the soil has settled into layers. Heavier particles settle out first, sand above, silt above that, and very fine clay and organic matter will stay in suspension for days. After the water has cleared, percentages of the various particles can be determined. Fifty to 60 percent sand and 35 to 40 percent clay will yield strong bricks. The Cooperative State Research, Education, and Extension Service at New Mexico State University recommends a mix of not more than 1/3 clay, not less than 1/2 sand, and never more than 1/3 silt.

During the Great Depression, designer and builder Hugh W. Comstock used cheaper materials and made a specialized adobe brick called "Bitudobe." His first adobe house was built in 1936. In 1948, he published the book Post-Adobe; Simplified Adobe Construction Combining A Rugged Timber Frame And Modern Stabilized Adobe, which described his method of construction, including how to make "Bitudobe." In 1938, he served as an adviser to the architects Franklin & Kump Associates, who built the Carmel High School, which used his Post-adobe system.

=== Adobe wall construction ===
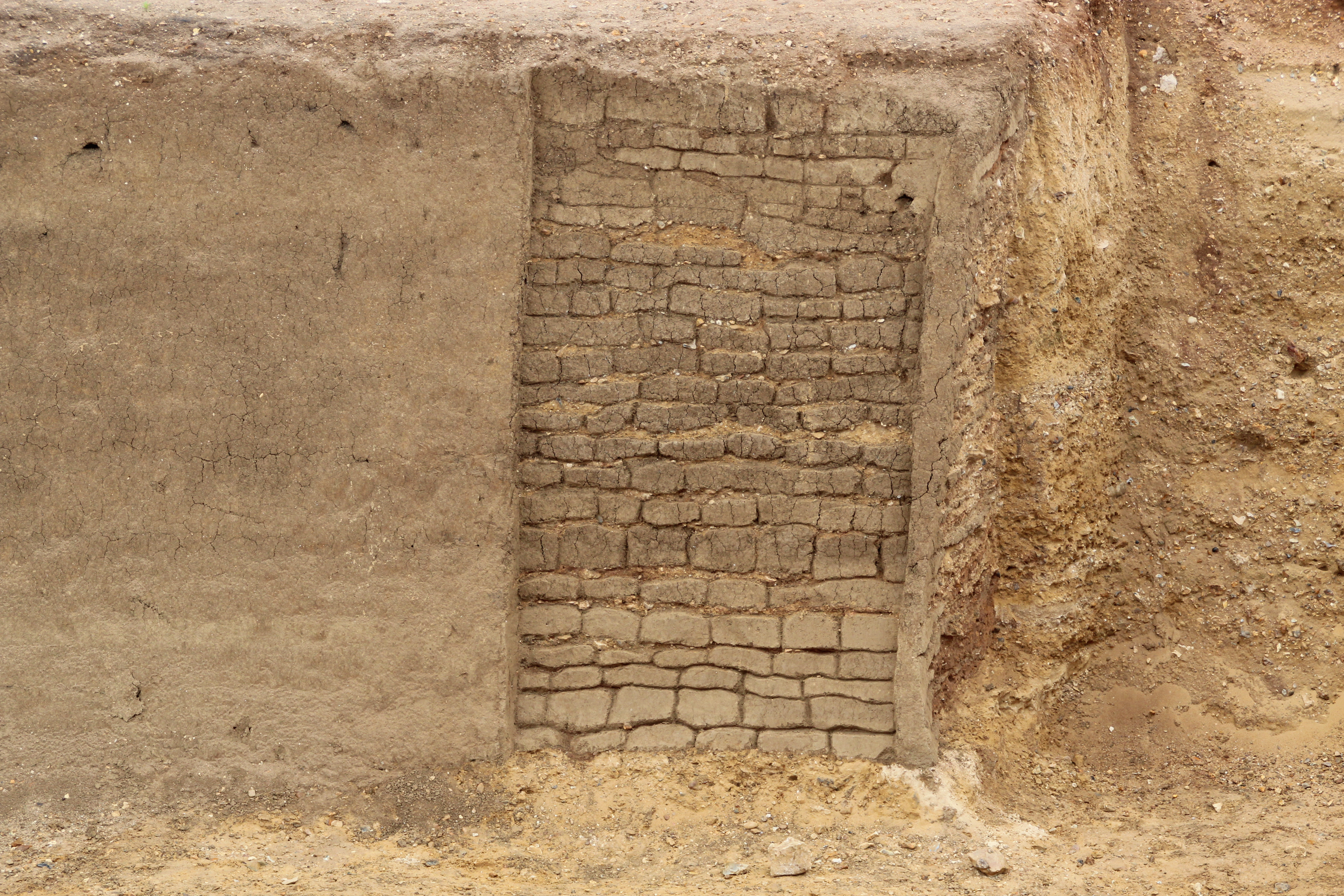
The earthen plaster removed, exposing the adobe bricks at Fort St. Sebastien in France

The ground supporting an adobe structure should be compressed, as the weight of an adobe wall is significant and foundation settling may cause cracking of the wall. Footing depth is to be below the ground frost level. The footing and stem wall are commonly 60 and 35 cm (24 and 14 inches) thick, respectively. Modern construction codes call for the use of reinforcing steel in the footing and stem wall. Adobe bricks are laid by course. Adobe walls usually never rise above two stories as they are load-bearing and adobe has low structural strength. When creating window and door openings, a lintel is placed on top of the opening to support the bricks above. Atop the last courses of brick, bond beams made of heavy wood beams or modern reinforced concrete are laid to provide a horizontal bearing plate for the roof beams and to redistribute lateral earthquake loads to shear walls more able to carry the forces. To protect the interior and exterior adobe walls, finishes such as mud plaster, whitewash, or stucco can be applied. These protect the adobe wall from water damage, but need to be reapplied periodically. Alternatively, the walls can be finished with other nontraditional plasters that provide longer protection. Bricks made with stabilized adobe generally do not need protection of plasters.

=== Adobe roof ===
The traditional adobe roof has been constructed using a mixture of soil/clay, water, sand and organic materials. The mixture was then formed and pressed into wood forms, producing rows of dried earth bricks that would then be laid across a support structure of wood and plastered into place with more adobe.

Depending on the materials available, a roof may be assembled using wood or metal beams to create a framework to begin layering adobe bricks. Depending on the thickness of the adobe bricks, the framework has been preformed using a steel framing and a layering of a metal fencing or wiring over the framework to allow an even load as masses of adobe are spread across the metal fencing like cob and allowed to air dry accordingly. This method was demonstrated with an adobe blend heavily impregnated with cement to allow even drying and prevent cracking.

The more traditional flat adobe roofs are functional only in dry climates that are not exposed to snow loads. The heaviest wooden beams, called vigas, lie atop the wall. Across the vigas lie smaller members called latillas and upon those brush is then laid. Finally, the adobe layer is applied.

To construct a flat adobe roof, beams of wood were laid to span the building, the ends of which were attached to the tops of the walls. Once the vigas, latillas and brush are laid, adobe bricks are placed. An adobe roof is often laid with bricks slightly larger in width to ensure a greater expanse is covered when placing the bricks onto the roof. Following each individual brick should be a layer of adobe mortar, recommended to be at least 25 mm (1 in) thick to make certain there is ample strength between the brick's edges and also to provide a relative moisture barrier during rain.

Depending on the materials, adobe roofs can be inherently fire-proof. The construction of a chimney can greatly influence the construction of the roof supports, creating an extra need for care in choosing the materials. The builders can make an adobe chimney by stacking simple adobe bricks in a similar fashion as the surrounding walls.

In 1927, the Uniform Building Code (UBC) was adopted in the United States. Local ordinances, referencing the UBC added requirements to building with adobe. These included: restriction of building height of adobe structures to 1-story, requirements for adobe mix (compressive and shear strength) and new requirements which stated that every building shall be designed to withstand seismic activity, specifically lateral forces. By the 1980s however, seismic related changes in the California Building Code effectively ended solid wall adobe construction in California; however Post-and-Beam adobe and veneers are still being used.

== Adobe around the world ==
The largest structure ever made from adobe is the Arg-é Bam built by the Achaemenid Empire. Other large adobe structures are the Huaca del Sol in Peru, with 100 million signed bricks and the ciudellas of Chan Chan and Tambo Colorado, both in Peru.

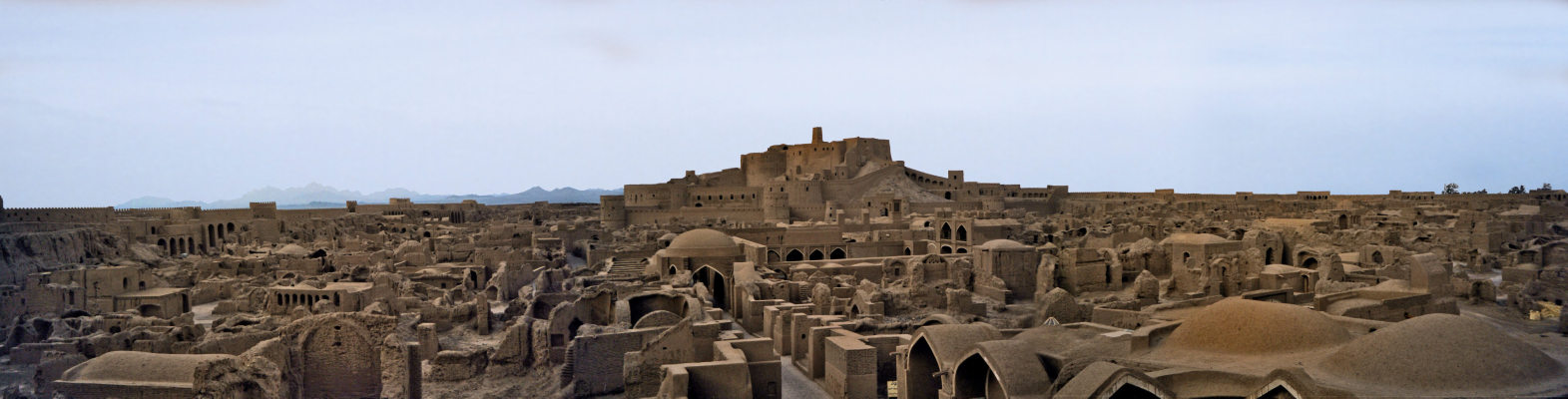
The citadel of Bam, Iran, or Arg-é Bam, in Kerman province, Iran: the world's largest adobe structure, dating to at least 500 BC
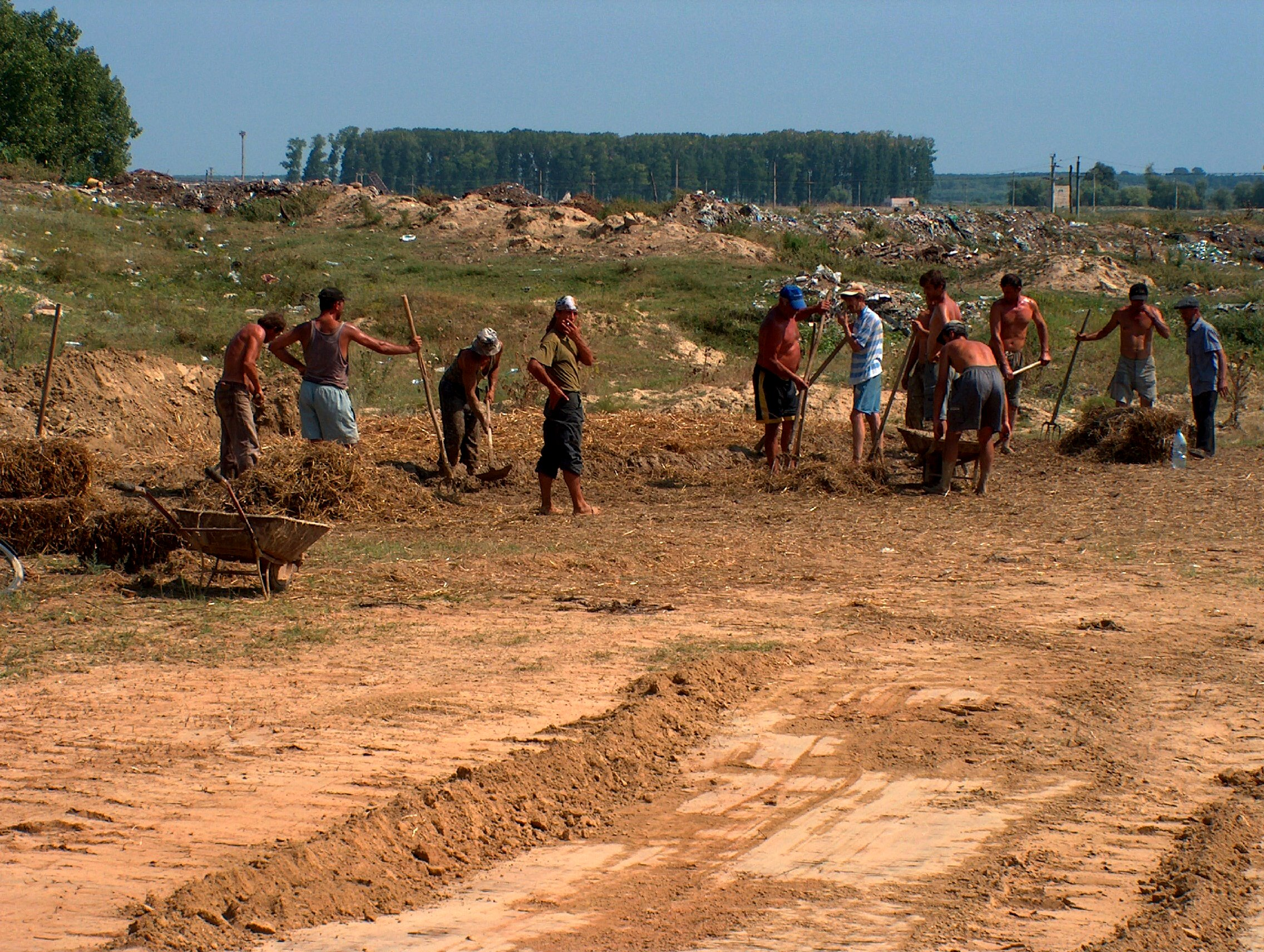
Still in production today, Romania's Danube Delta

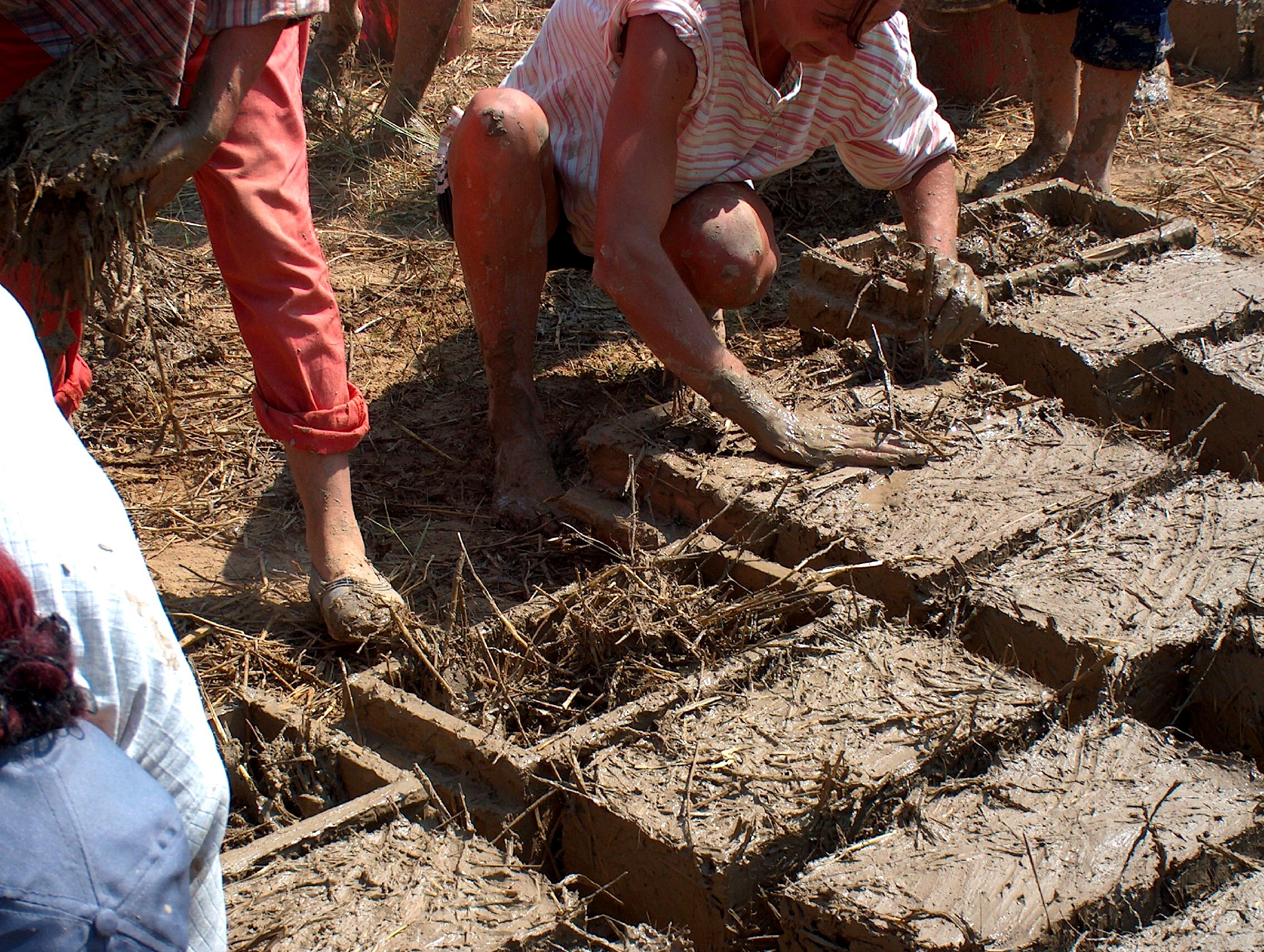
Mixing mud and straw in brick frames

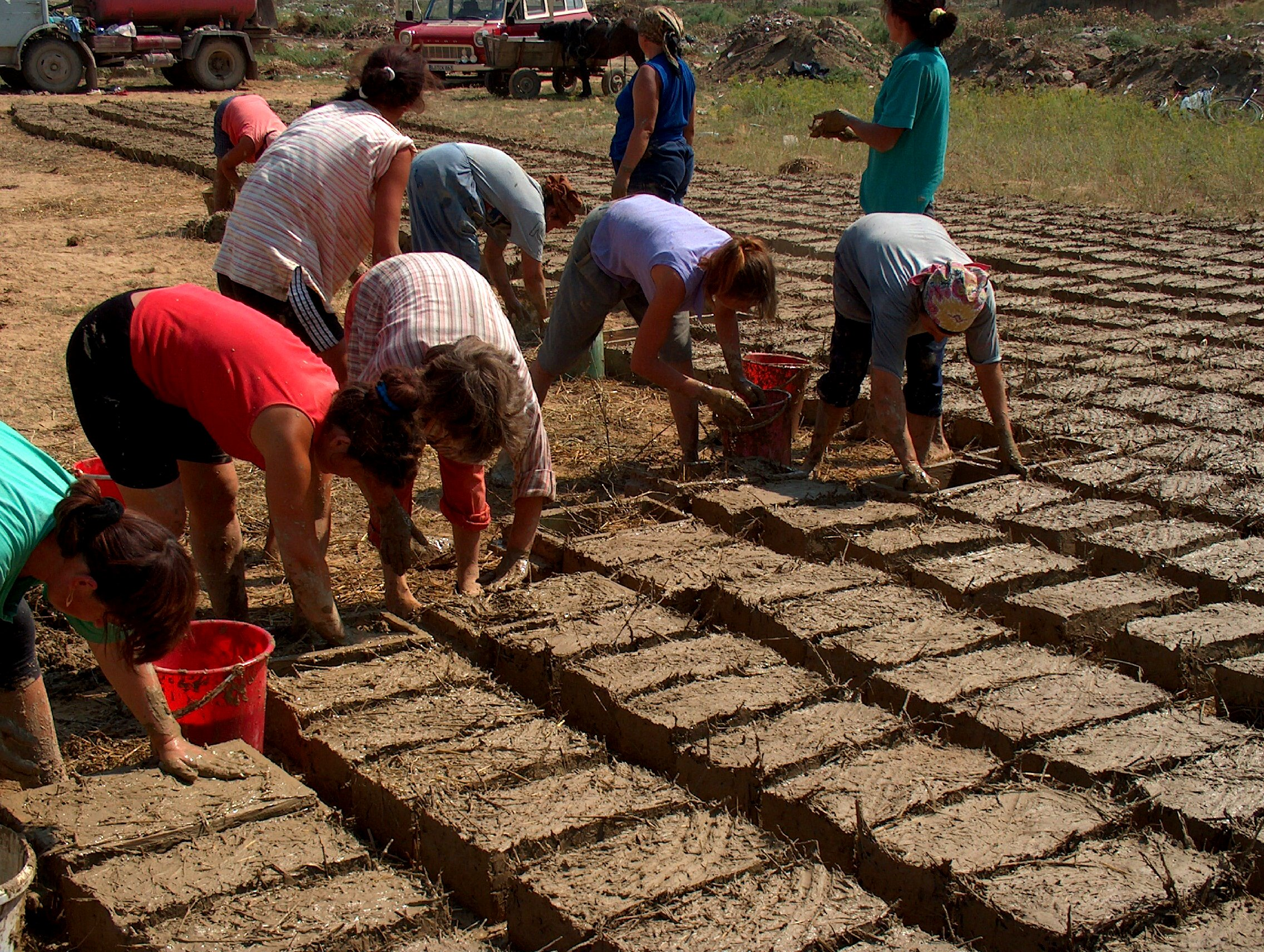
Community effort

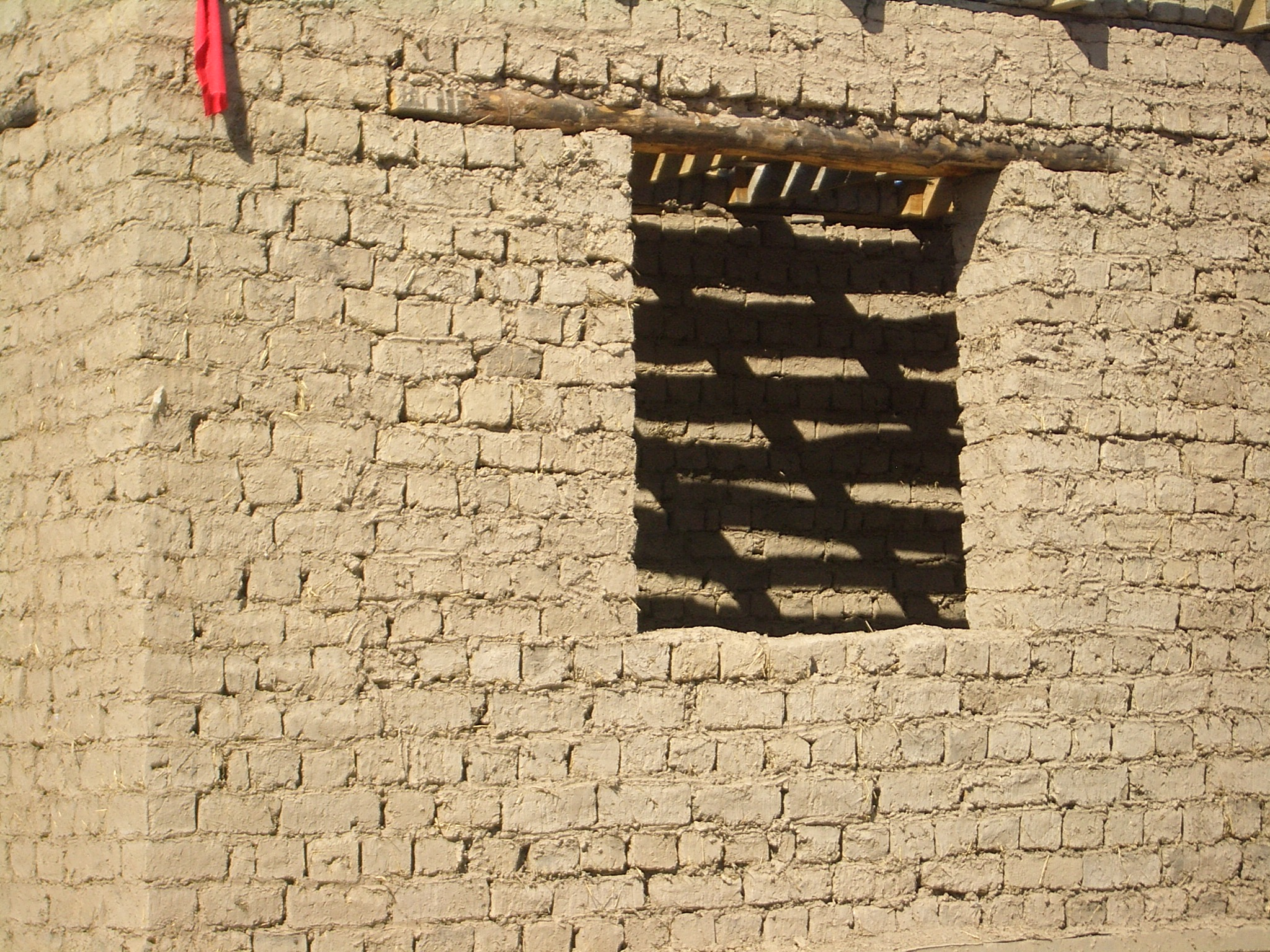
Adobe brick house under construction in Kyrgyzstan

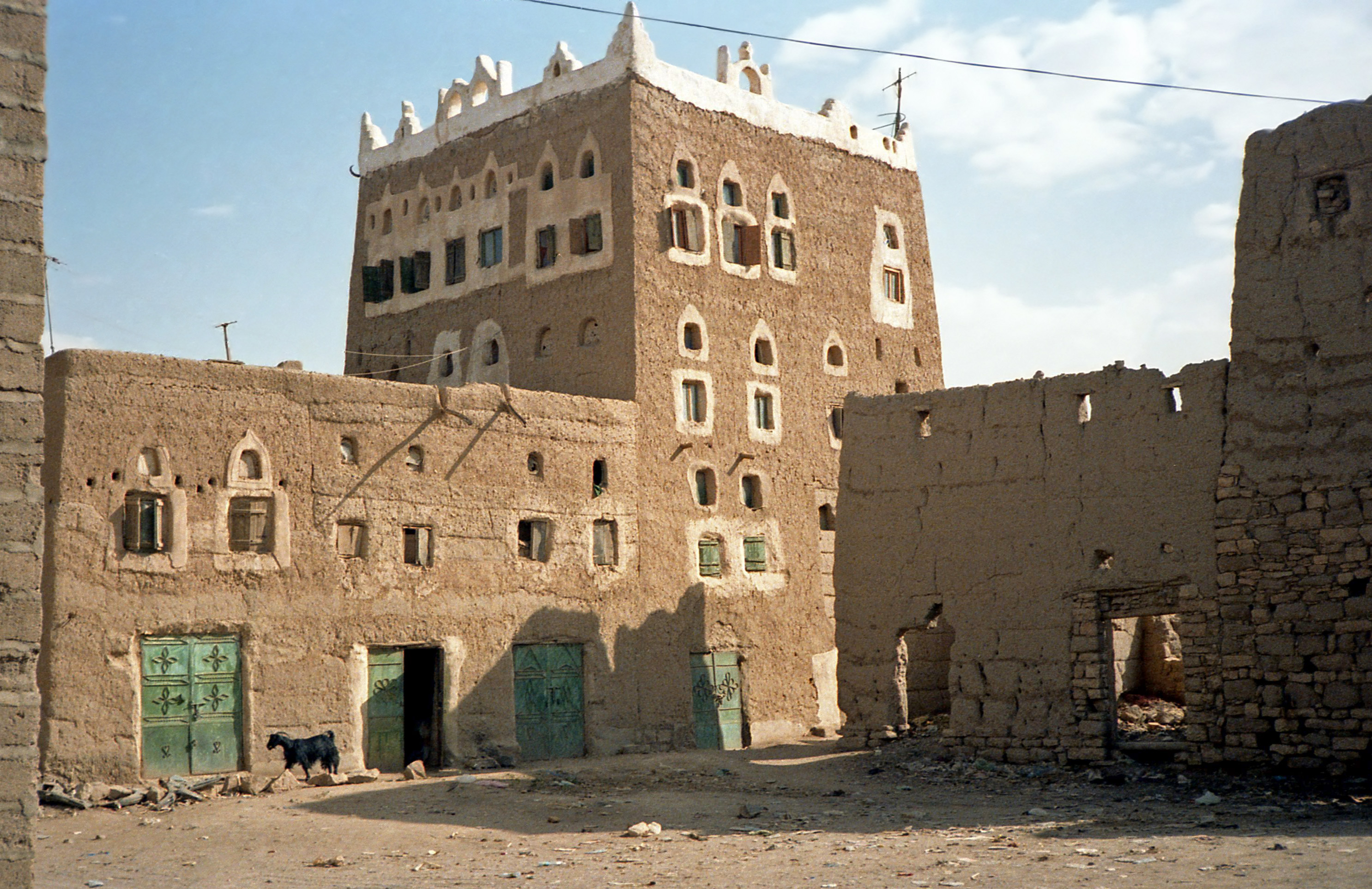
House in Saada, Yemen

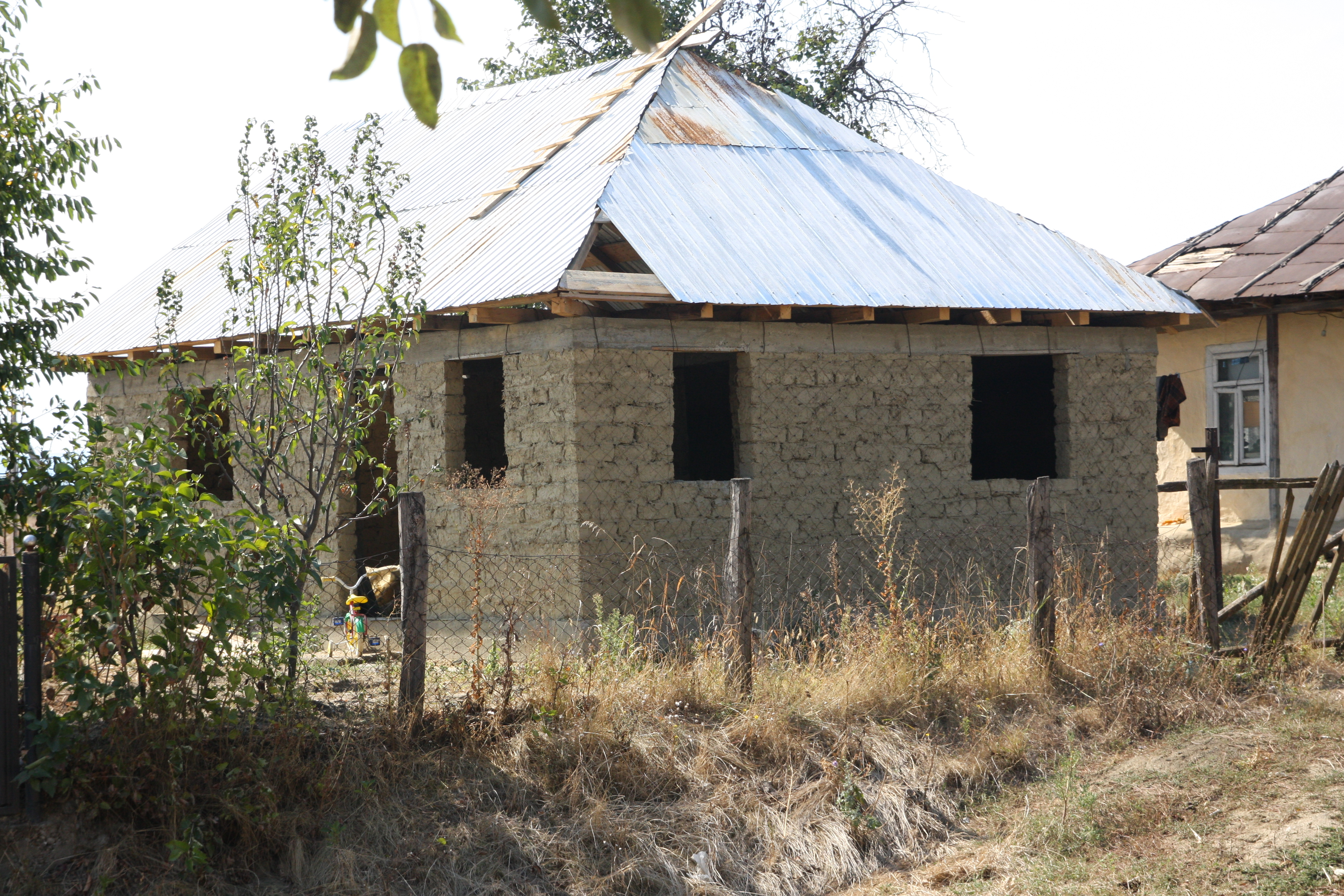
Adobe brick house under construction in Romania

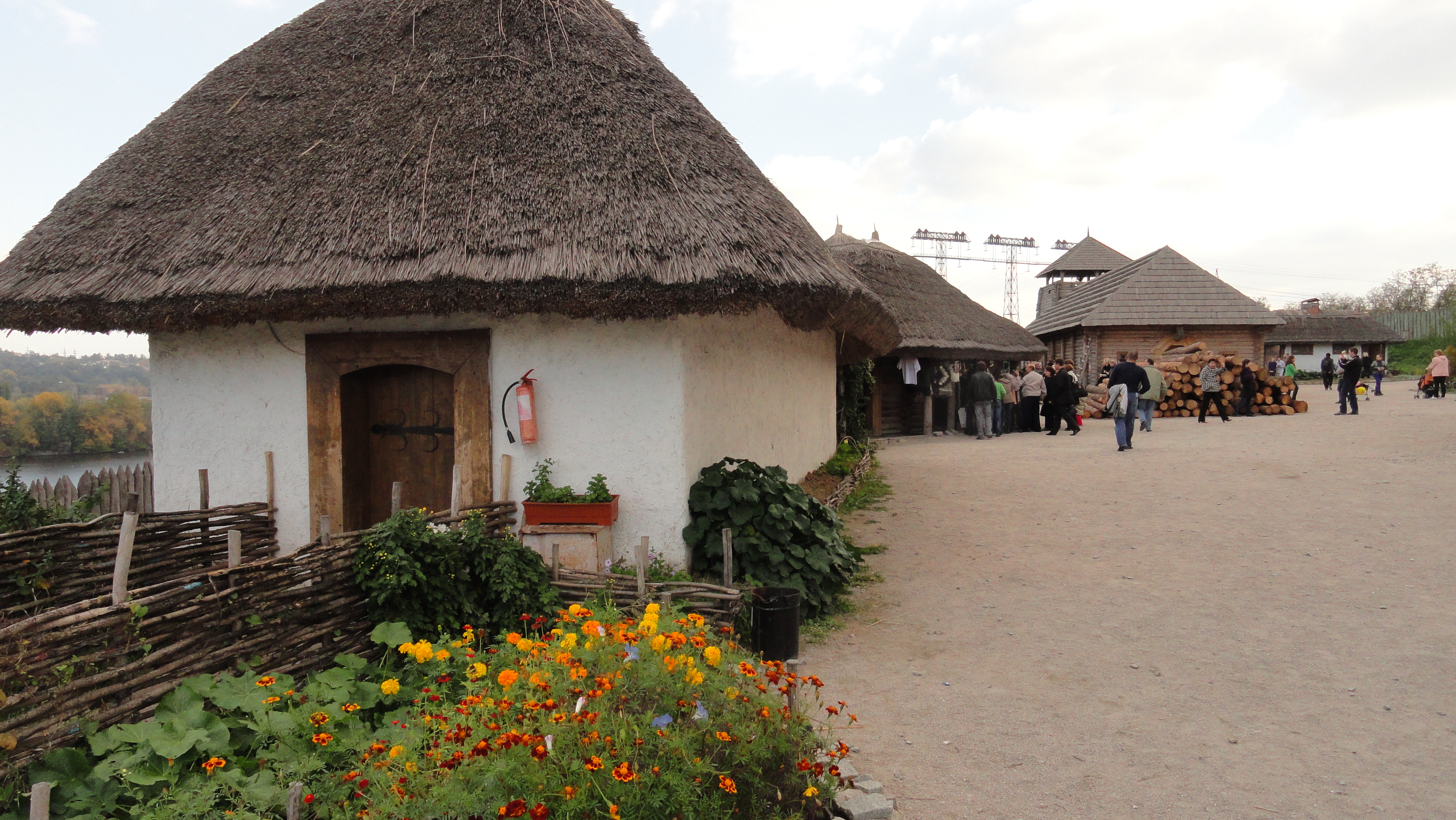
Ukrainian Cossack hut

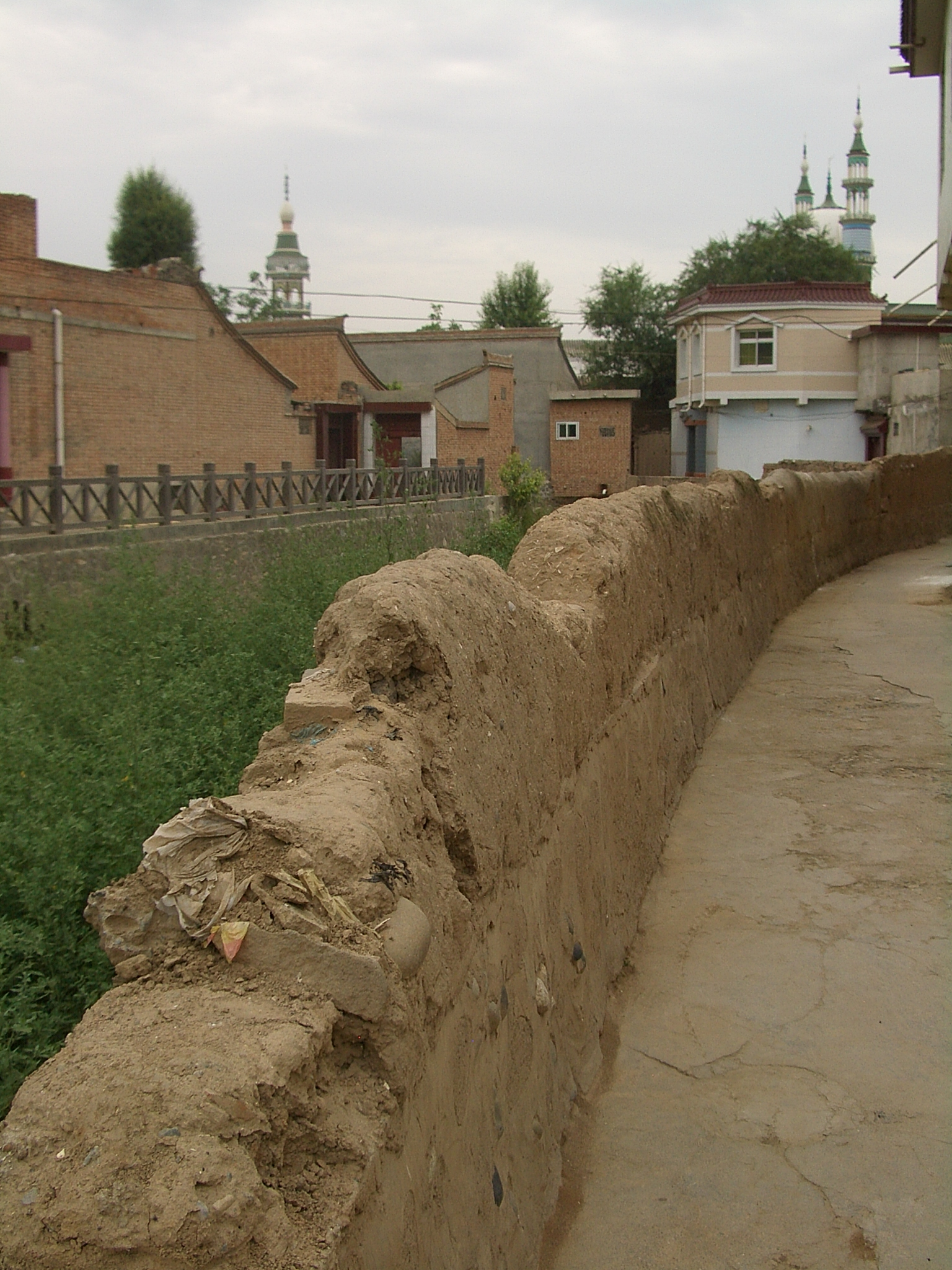
An adobe wall in Linxia City, Gansu, China

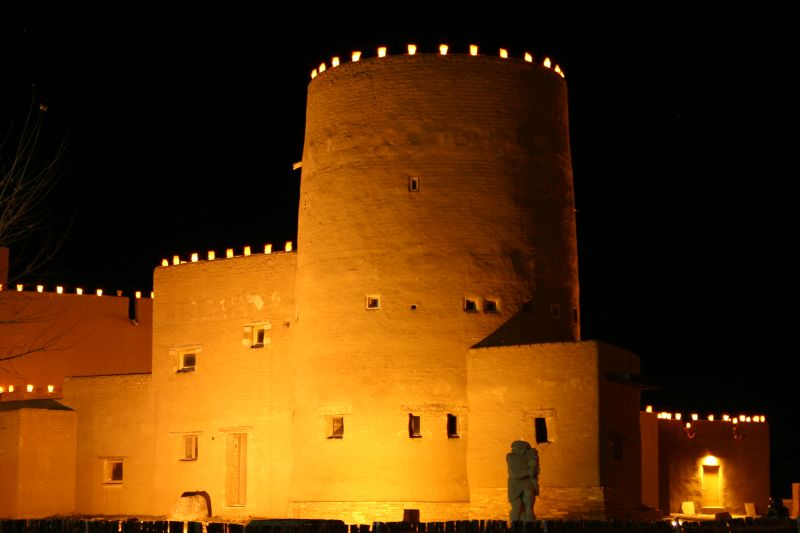
Poeh Museum tower, the tallest adobe structure in New Mexico, US

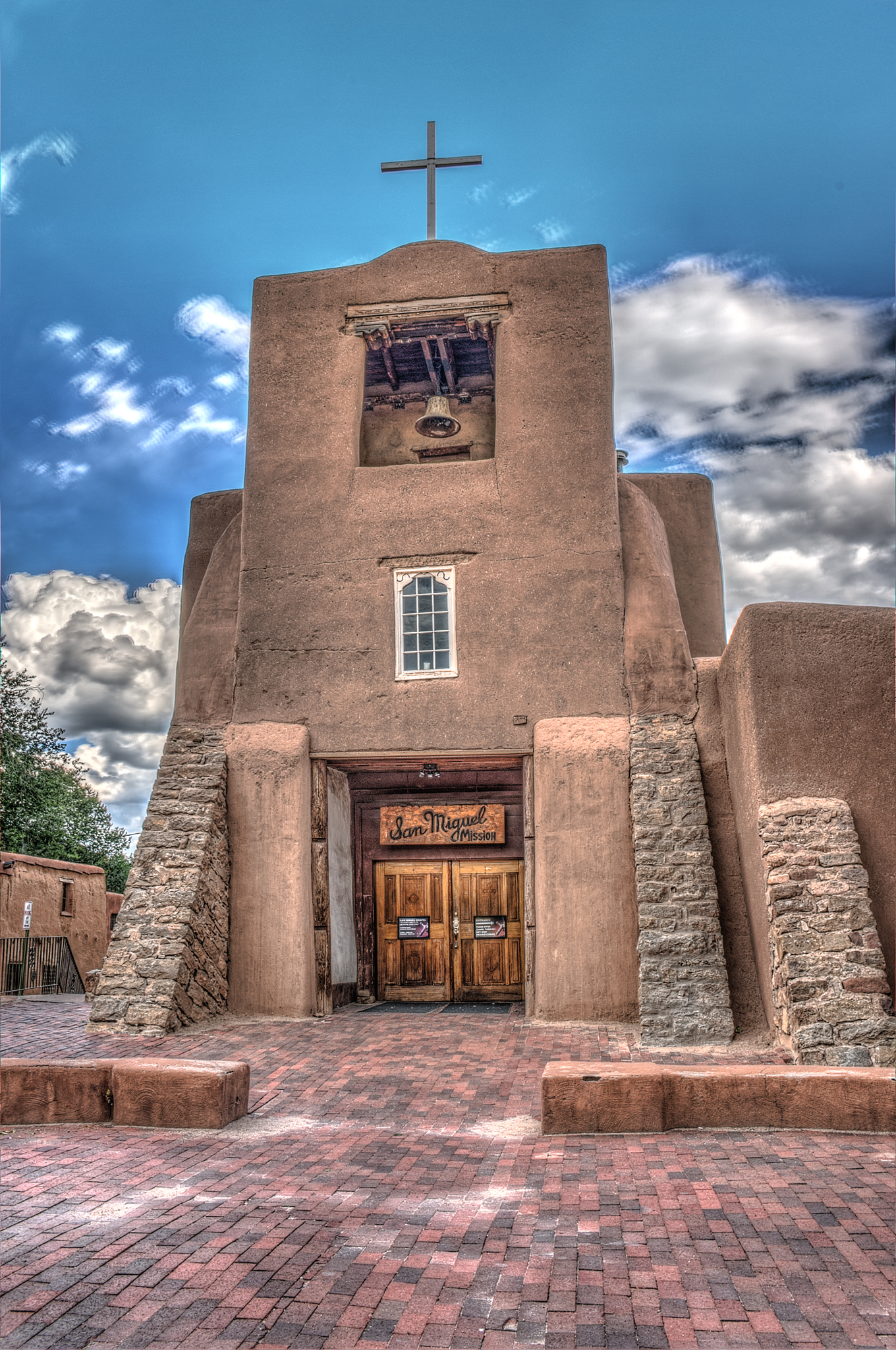
San Miguel Mission in Santa Fe, New Mexico

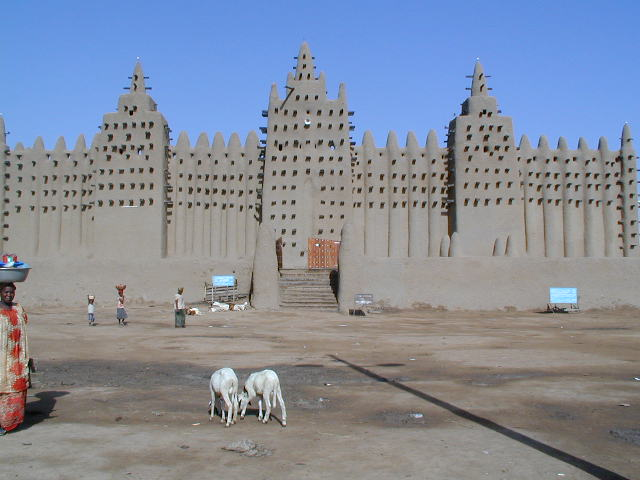
Great Mosque of Djenné, famous building made from banco, a type of adobe

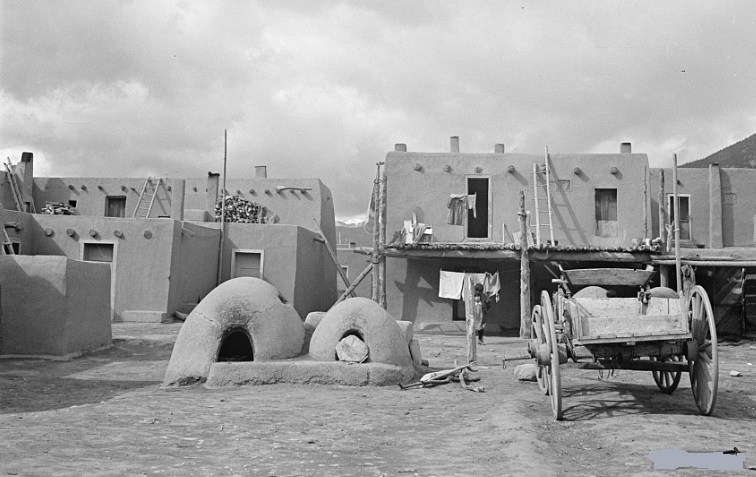
Taos Pueblo showing adobe-ovens

== See also ==
- Alker – Earth-based stabilized building material
- Cas di torto – Historic torto houses in Aruba
- Cob (building) – Building material made of soil and fiber
- Compressed earth block – Building material
- Earth structure – Building or other structure made largely from soil
- Hassan Fathy – Egyptian architect (1900–1989)
- Mission San Xavier del Bac – 17th-century Spanish mission in Arizona
- Monterey Colonial architecture – Style of architecture used adobe walls
- Mudbrick – Earth blocks for construction
- Qadad – Old technique used in plastering walls and cisterns (waterproofing plaster)
- Qalat (fortress) – Type of castle
- Rammed earth – Construction material of damp subsoil
- Sod house – Turf house used in early colonial North America
- Superadobe – Form of earthbag construction
- Taq Kasra – Persian archeological site in Iraq (also known as Ctesiphon Arch) in Iraq is the largest mud brick arch in the world, built beginning in 540 AD
- Wattle and daub – Building technique using woven wooden supports packed with clay or mud
