= Quadiriki Caves =

Cave in Aruba

Quadiriki
- Quadirikiri, Guadirikiri
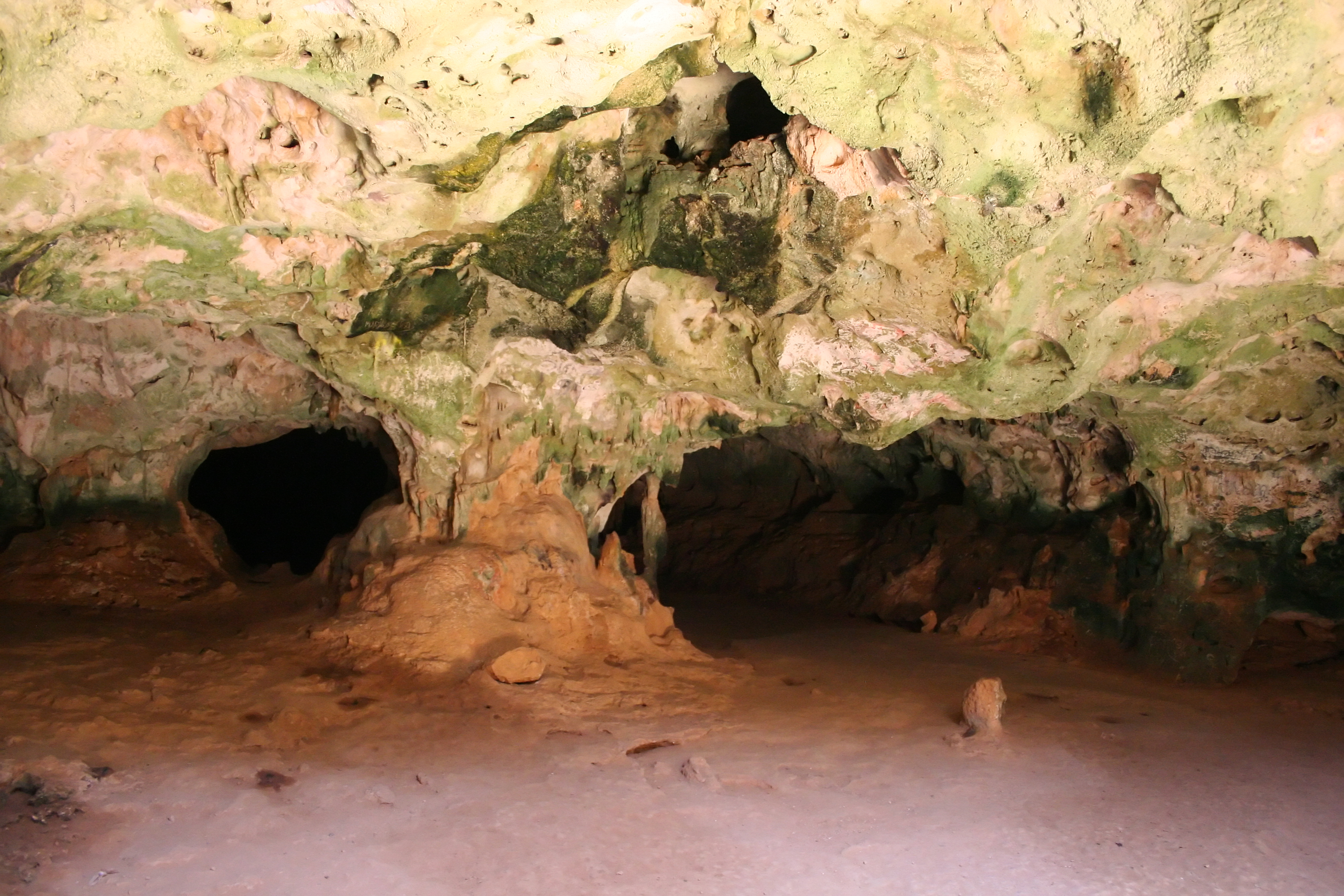
- Quadiriki Cave

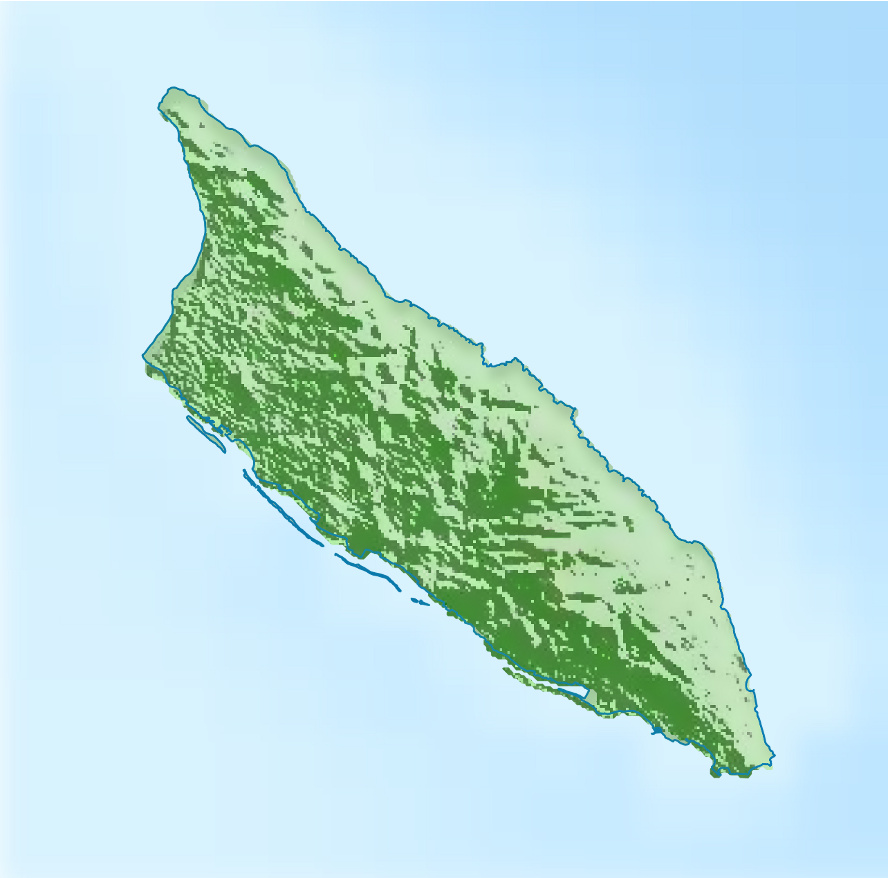
- Location within Aruba
- 12°28′59.88″N 69°55′00″W
- Cultures: Arawak
- Location: Arikok National Park, Aruba
- Region: Caribbean, Aruba

Site notes
- Material: Limestone
- Length: 150 metres (490 ft); 30 metres (98 ft)

The Quadiriki Caves, also spelled as Guadirikiri Caves or Quadirikiri Cave, are situated in Arikok National Park on the island of Aruba. These caves, located at the base of a limestone terrace, contain Amerindian petroglyphs. The name of the caves originates from the Arawak language.

The largest cave extends approximately 150 m (490 ft). The first two chambers are illuminated by natural openings in the cave ceiling, while the third chamber is characterized by its damp and dark environment, often filled with bat guano.Stalactites and stalagmites can be observed within the limestone cave.

To the east of the main cave, there is a smaller cave measuring approximately 30 m (98 ft) in length. This cave stands out for its remarkable abundance of Amerindian petroglyphs.

According to local folklore, the Quadirikiri Caves are associated with a mythical tale involving the daughter of an Indian chief. She fell in love with someone disapproved of by her father, resulting in her imprisonment within the cave. Meanwhile, her lover was confined to the nearby Huliba Cave (Tunnel of Love). Despite their captivity, the lovers managed to meet underground. Legend has it that both individuals met a tragic fate within the cave, and their spirits ascended to heaven through the openings cave's roof.

== Gallery ==
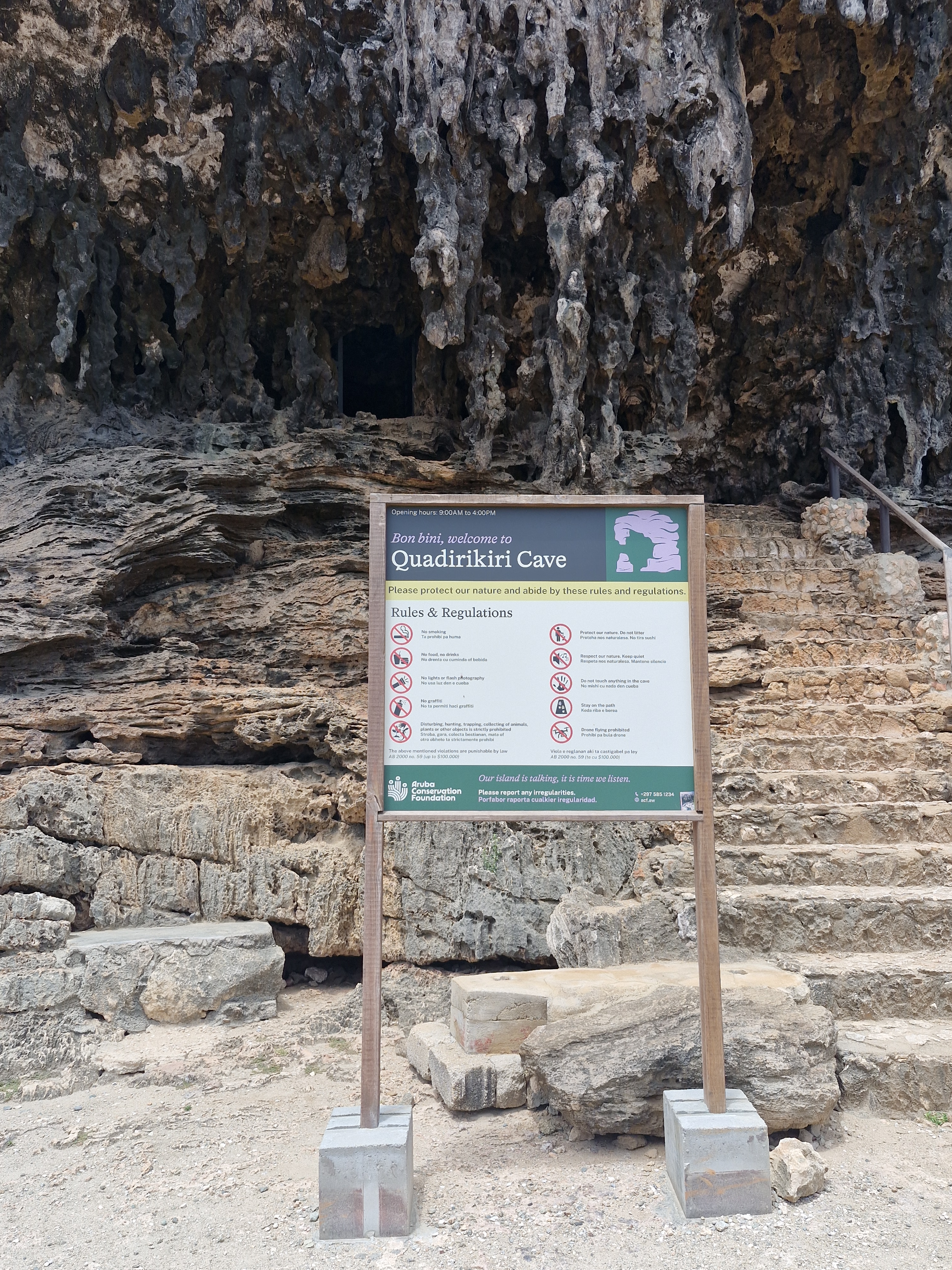
Quadirikiri Cave sign (National Park Aruba) - Please protect our nature and abide by these rules and regulations

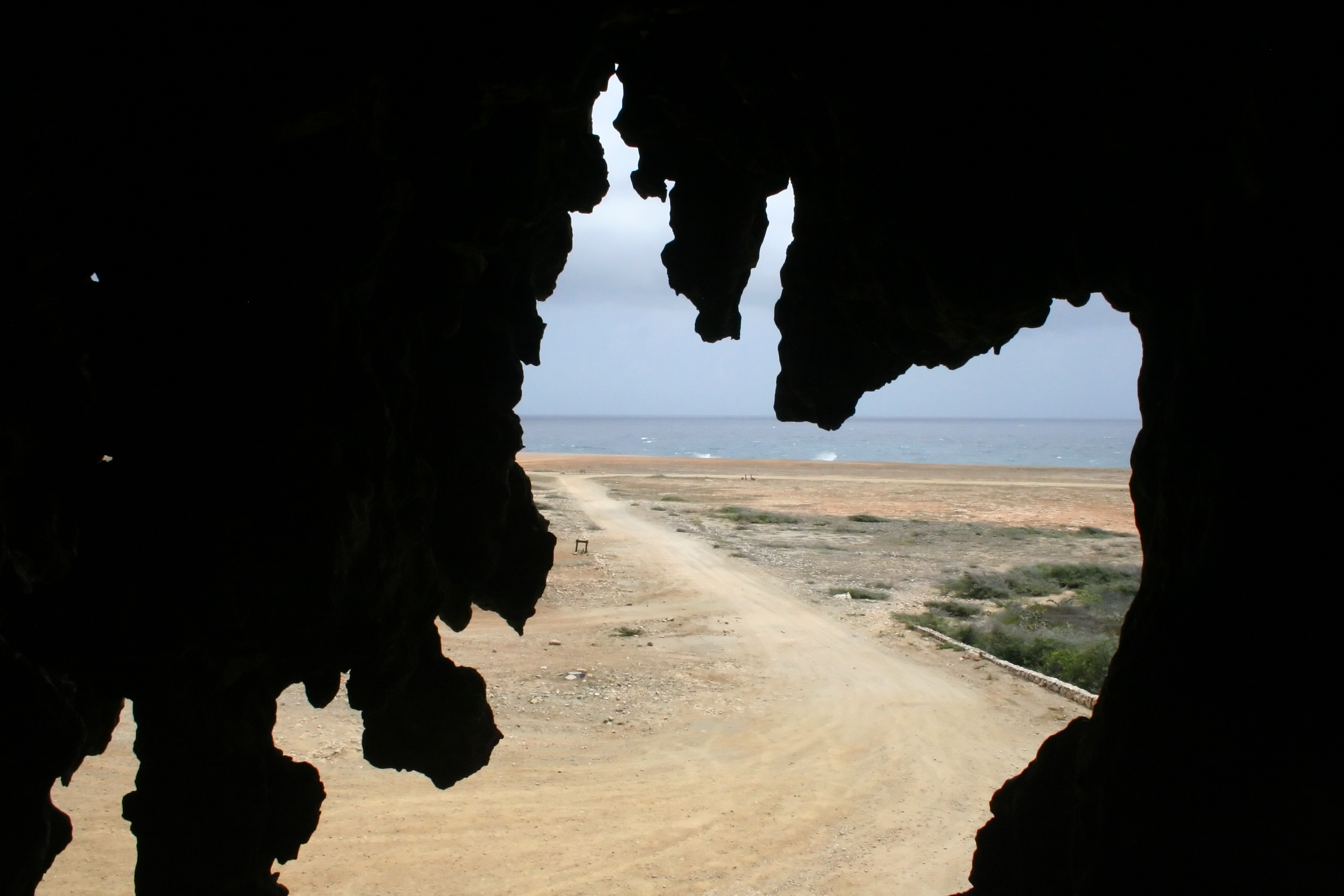
View from the inside out

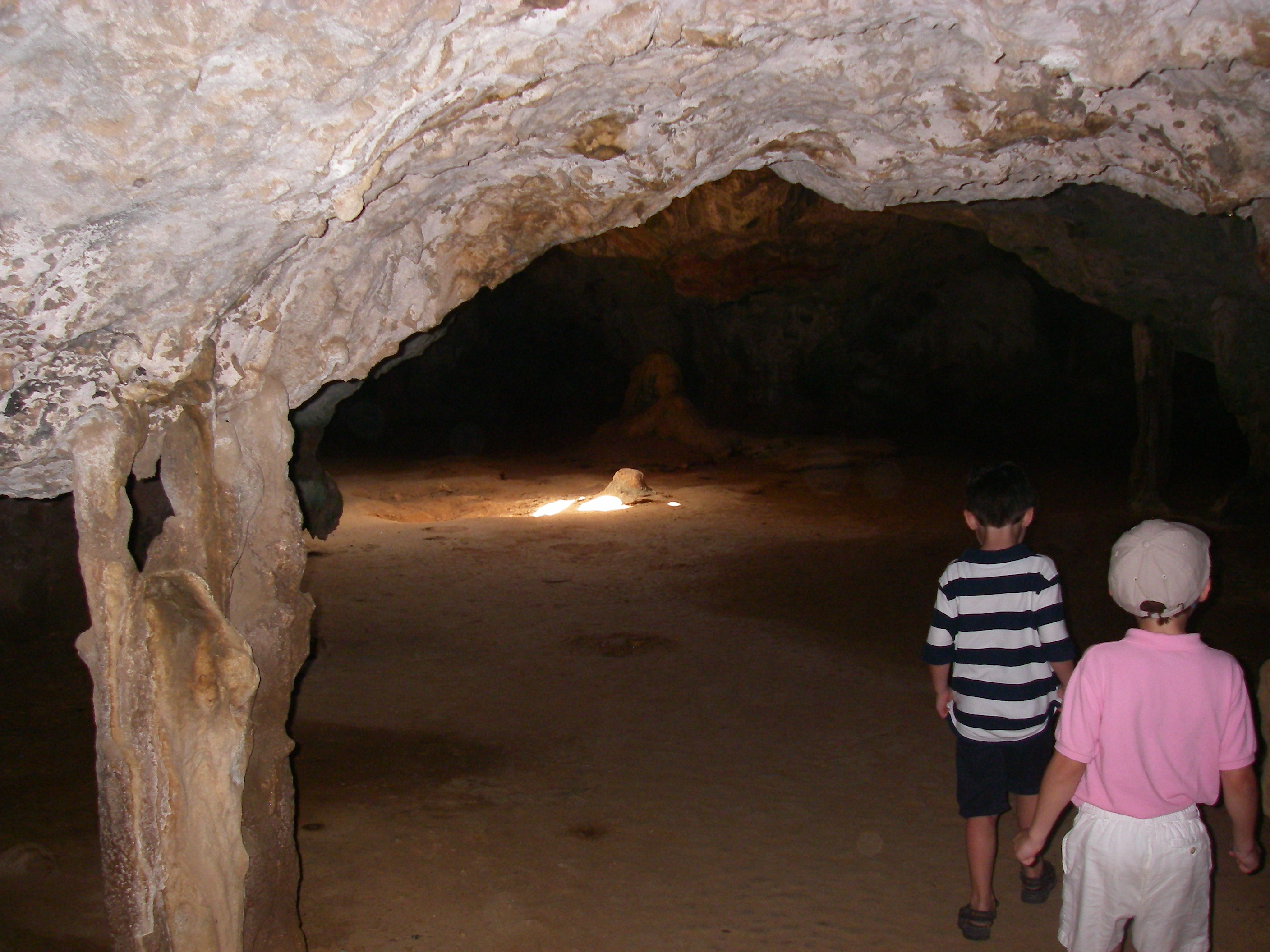
Visitors in the cave
