= Arikok National Park =

National Park in Aruba

- IUCN category II (national park)
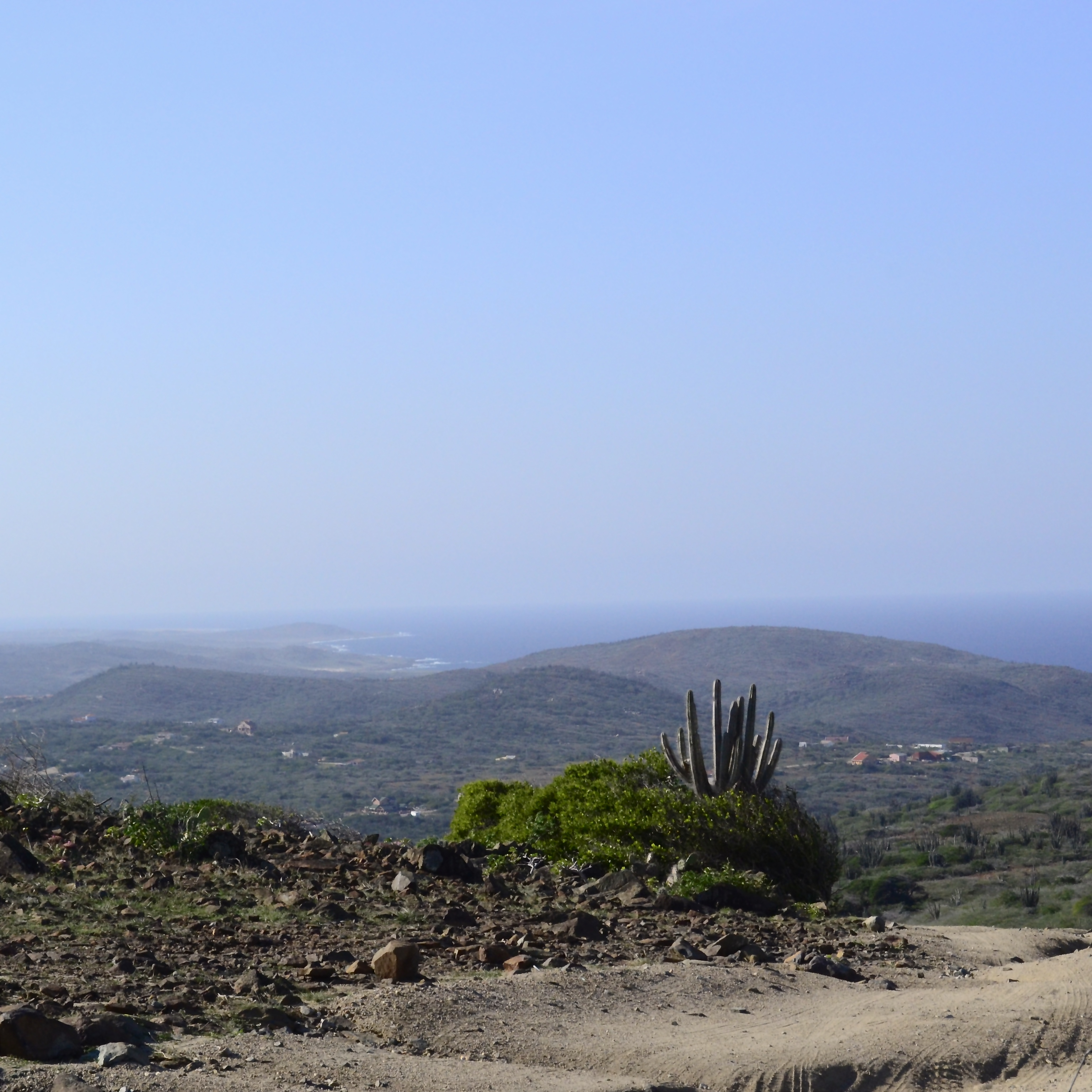
- View of the rolling hills in Arikok National Park
- Map of notable sites and landmarks in Arikok National Park.
- Nearest city: Noord, Santa Cruz and Oranjestad, capital of Aruba in the Kingdom of the Netherlands
- Coordinates: 12°29′56″N 69°55′36″W
- Area: 34 km^{2} (13 sq mi)
- Established: 2000
- Visitors: 10,000
- Governing body: Aruba Conservation Foundation (ACF)
- Website: www.arubanationalpark.org

Arikok National Park, covering 7,907 acres (32 km^{2}) in the northeastern region of Aruba, was officially established in 2000. Approximately 20% of Aruba's total land area is designated as a National Park, dedicated to safeguarding the park's biodiversity, geological formations and historical and cultural significance.

== Etymology ==
The establishment of Cunucu Arikok resulted from the development of Arikok National Park. This region was once a small plantation owned by Arie Kok, featuring an adobe house (cas di torto). Surrounding the house, there existed a substantial, wild garden with nameplates highlighting various common Aruban plant species. Moreover, within the rural expanse, dolerite rocks adorned with indigenous rock paintings can be found. One of these paintings serves as the current logo of the nature reserve. The reserve's name also originates from the proprietor of the adobe house, which remains within the reserve in a renovated state.

== History ==
=== Cultural and human history ===
Arikok National Park is repository of historical and cultural heritage. Its historical significance is evident in Fontein Cave, where, pre-Columbian, Arawak cave drawings offer a glimpse into early human activity. More recent additions include drawings by early European settlers and contemporary graffiti, which has prompted protective measures, including gating and locking the cave. It is only open to visitors who participate in guided tours with park staff.

The park features historic adobe plantation houses, the original cunucu (rural) houses known as Cas di torto. Cunucu Arikok, an early farmstead thoughtfully restored for preservation, recalls Aruba's agricultural history. Protective measures like cactus hedges and stone walls were erected to ward off goats, sheep, and donkeys.

Abandoned gold mines in the Miralamar area of the park are also visible. After closing in 1916, the gold mines and surrounding structures are now largely overgrown.

=== Development of Arikok National Park ===
The concept of a national park in Aruba was first considered in the late 1960s. However, it wasn't until 1980 that a plan was put forth for the development of the Arikok-Jamanota area as a national park. Only a portion of this plan was realized, leading to the creation of Cunucu Arikok.

In 1995, the government introduced a new plan for the national park's development, coinciding with the implementation of the Nature Protection Regulation. This regulation laid the foundation for a comprehensive nature protection policy on the island of Aruba and marked the beginning of the national park's establishment.

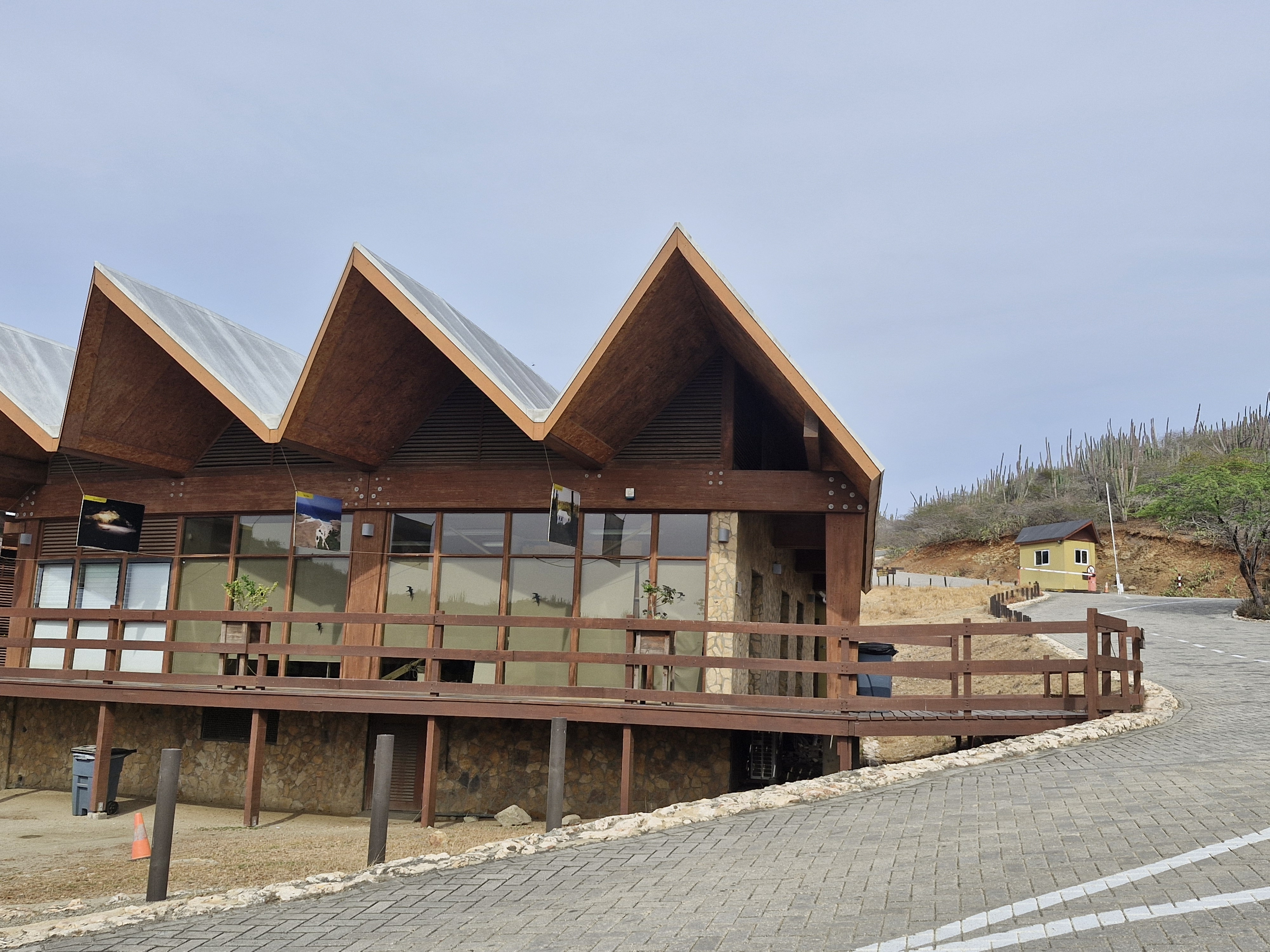
Visitor Center, Arikok Park, San Fuego, Santa cruz Aruba

The year 1996 witnessed the approval of the Nature and Landscape Structure Memorandum by the Aruban government. A commission was subsequently formed to establish Arikok National Park, and in 1997, they formulated a policy document outlining how the national park would be managed.

Finally, in 2000, the Arikok National Park was officially established through a Ministerial Order. By 2003, it had evolved into a foundation, Aruba Conservation Foundation (ACF) (formerly Fundacion Parke Nacional Aruba (FPNA)).

== Geology ==
=== Stratigraphy ===
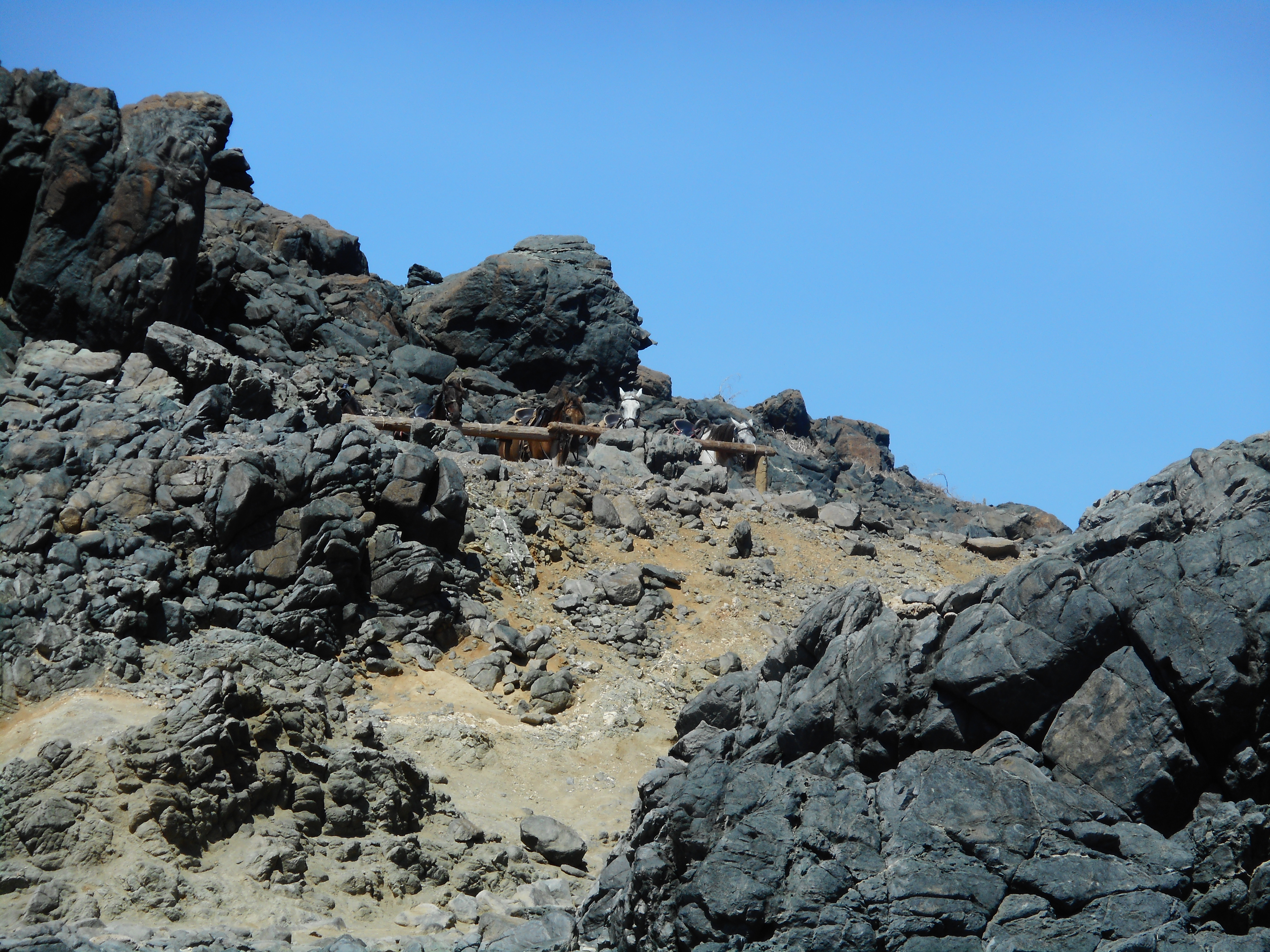
Pillow lava at Conchi (Natural Pool)

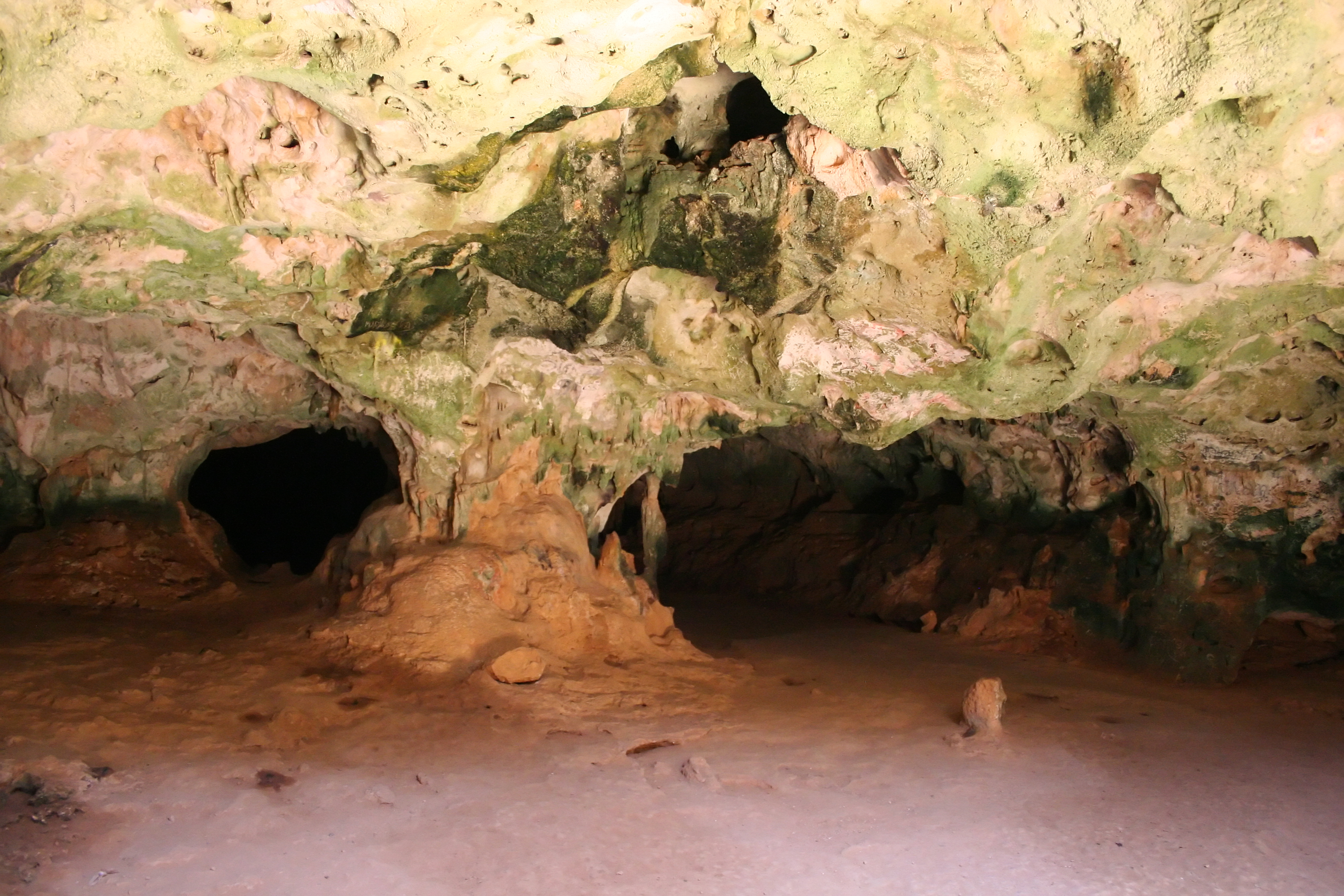
Interior of Guadirikiri Cave

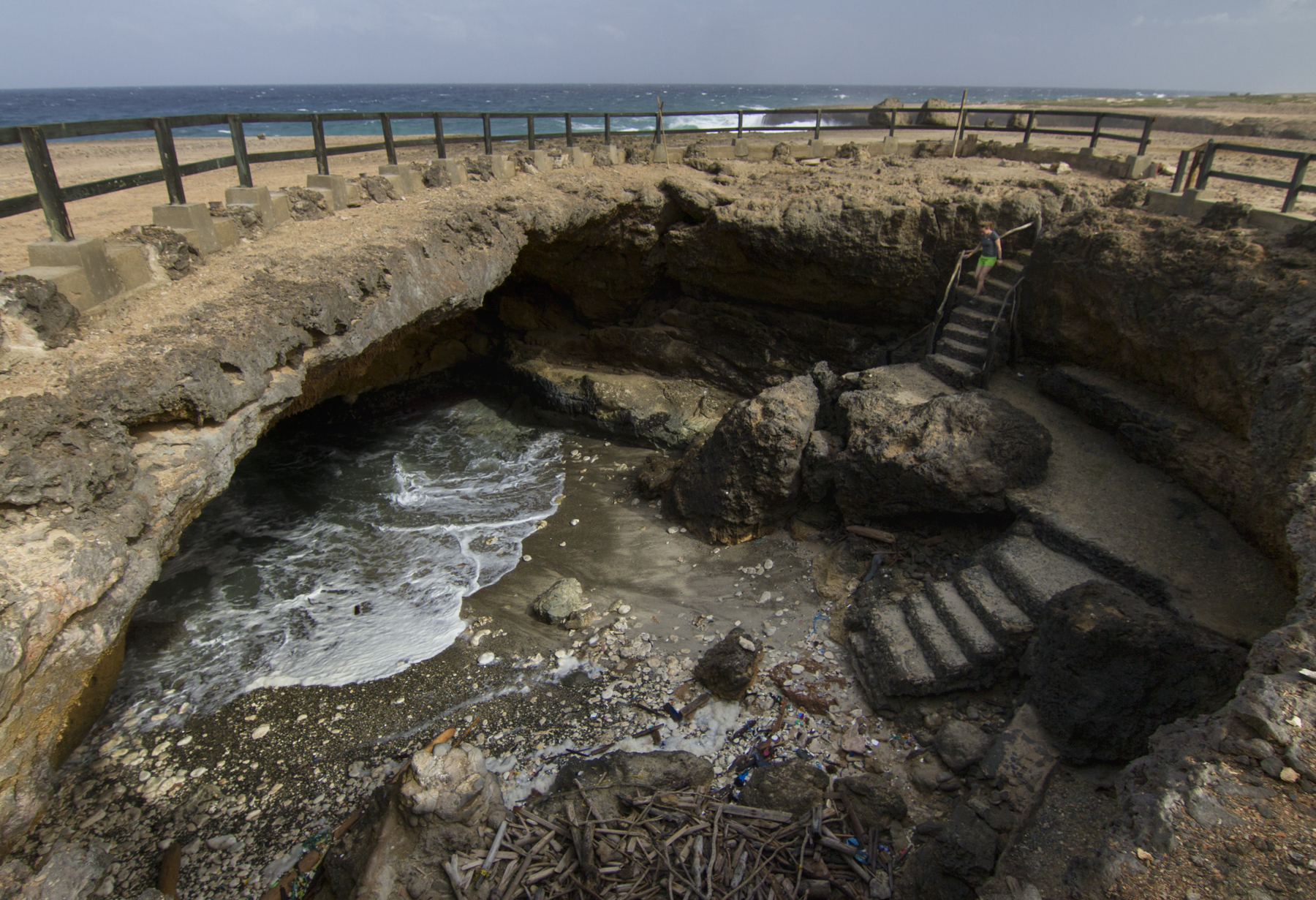
Small limestone bridge formation

Arikok National Park features three primary geological formations, the Aruba lava formation (ALF), Aruba Batholith, and limestone terraces. The youngest formation, limestone shelves, rests atop the second-oldest, the Batholith. The oldest, the ALF, is not visible. Magma rose, cutting through formations and solidifying into quartz veins. These veins are younger than the surrounding formations. The magma brought up minerals, including gold. Veins vary from a single centimeter to over a meter in width. These quartz veins were mined for their gold content. More than 20 veins were mined, with the Miralamar mine being particularly notable.

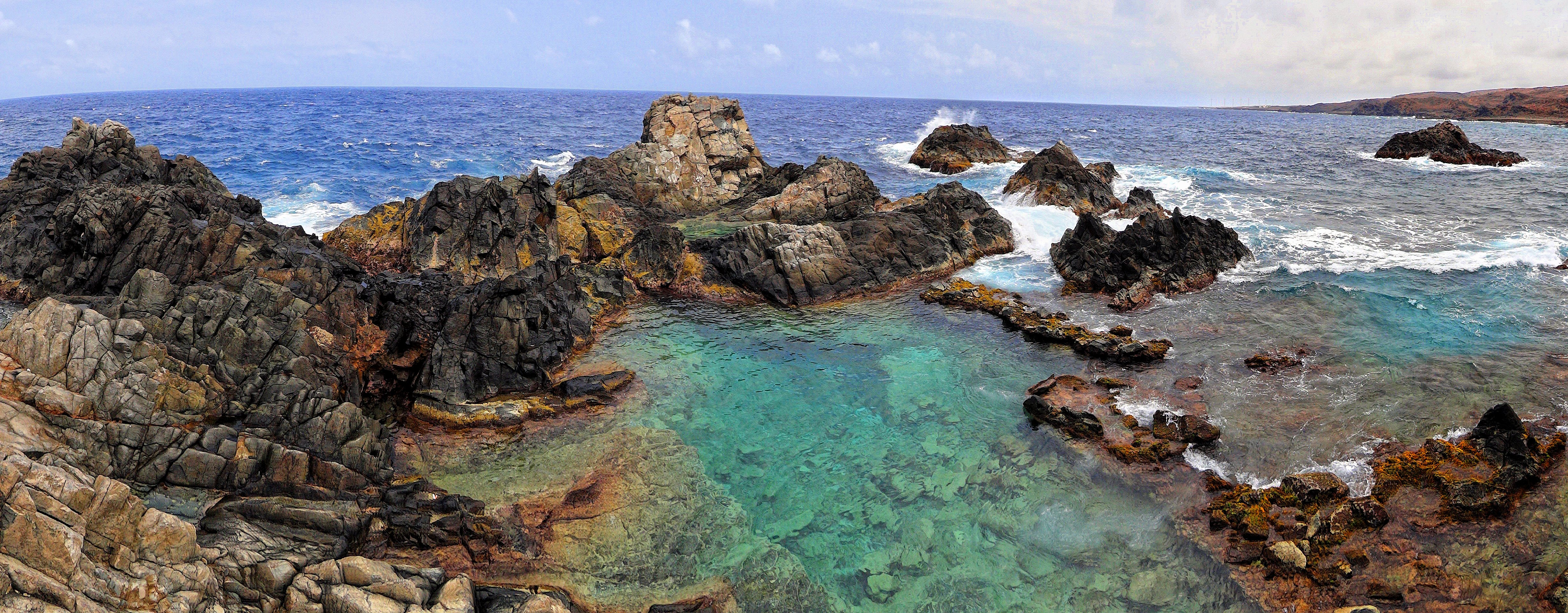
Conchi (Natural Pool)

== Ecology ==
=== Endemic species ===
Aruba is home to several unique species, some of which are endemic to the island. Within the Arikok National Park, these unique species find habitat and thrive due to the specific microclimates created by the rock outcrops. Notable endemic reptiles in the area include the cascabel (Crotalus unicolor), the santanero or (Aruban) Baker's cat-eyed snake (Leptodeira bakeri), and the kododo blauw or Aruban whiptail lizard (Cnemidophorus arubensis). The avian inhabitants include the shoco or Aruban burrowing owl (Athene cunicularia arubensis) and the prikichi or Aruban parakeet (Aratinga pertinax arubensis).

=== Vegetation types ===
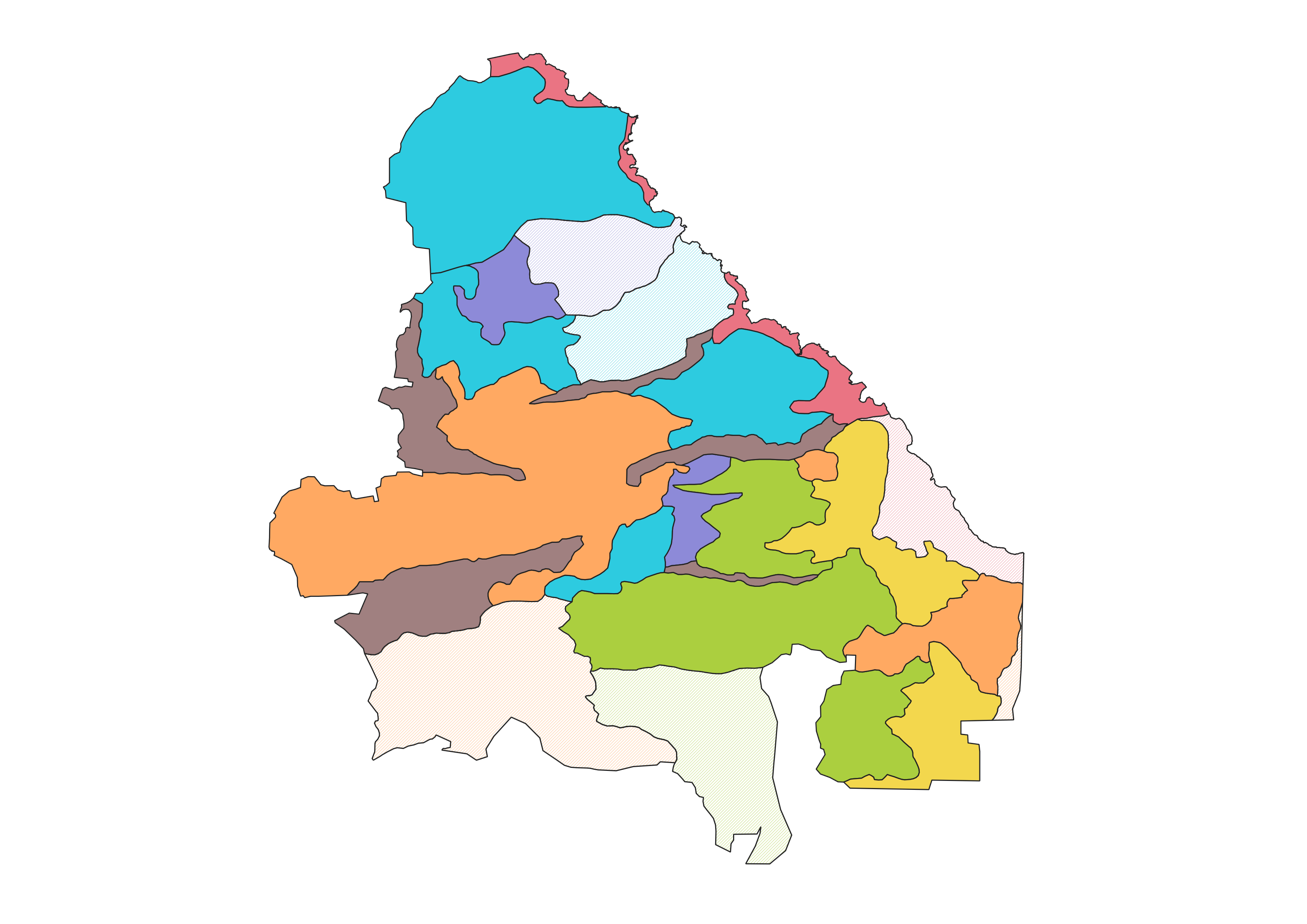
Main vegetation types in Arikok National Park. 1 Fofoti-Druif-Cocorobana 2 Camari-Basoro preto-Yerba chico 3 Beishi di baranca-Seida-Funfun 4 Beishi di baranca-Walishali-Basora preto-Mata di piska 5 Hubada-Mata di yuana-Cordon di San Francisco 6 Hubada-Breba-Camari 7 Hubada-Walishali *The hatched areas are presumed to represent the same vegetation type as indicated by the respective color.

Arikok National Park features seven vegetation types (using local names). Most vegetation is almost exclusively found in and around arroyos and leeward sides of hills.

==== Fofoti–Druif–Cocorobana ====
Vegetation Type 1, Fofoti–Druif–Cocorobana, is primarily located along the coasts and in dune systems. Indicator species for this vegetation type include Banana di rif, Mansaniya, and Bai no bolbera. These three species are exclusive to this vegetation type and were not found in other field surveys.

==== Beishi di baranca–Seida–Funfun ====
Vegetation type 3, Beishi di Baranca–Seida–Funfun is exclusive to the limestone plateau in the southern part of the national park and is primarily made up of Beishi di baranca, Tuna, Seida, Basora preto, and Cadushi. Indicator species such as Bringamosa, Funfun, Yerba di sero, and Laseis are common in this type but can also be found in other vegetation types.

==== Beishi di baranca–Walishali–Basora preto–Mata di piska ====
Vegetation Type 4, Beishi di baranca–Walishali–Basora preto–Mata di piska, is exclusively found on the limestone plateau in the southern part of the national park. Primarily composed of Basora preto, Beishi di baranca, Seida, Tuna, and Flor di sanger, this vegetation type's key indicators include Walishali, Mata di piská, Loki-loki, Mata di yuana, and Palo cayente. Palo cayente is unique to this vegetation type, while the other indicators, though prevalent here, have also been observed in other vegetation types.

Types 3 and 4 exclusively occur on the limestone plateau. Key species, constituting over 50% of the plateau, include Beishi di baranca, Basora preto, Seida, Tuna, Walishali, Hubada, Cadushi, and Flor di sanger. Tanchi, Palo cayente, and Funfun are largely confined to the limestone plateau, seldom appearing in other areas. Found along the coast, this type is characterized by open, low vegetation due to strong trade winds, with Funfun being a common, salt-tolerant species. Trees are scarce in this environment.

==== Hubada–Breba–Camari ====
Vegetation type 6 is mainly in the northern part of the national park and other regional areas. This dry type thrives on the windward side of hills. Hubada, Basora preto, Tuna, and Bushi are common, appearing in over 50% of the surveys. Breba, Seida, and Cadushi also feature in over 50% of the surveys. Indicator species for this type include Shimarucu, Breba, Camari, Patia shimaron, and Yerba chico.

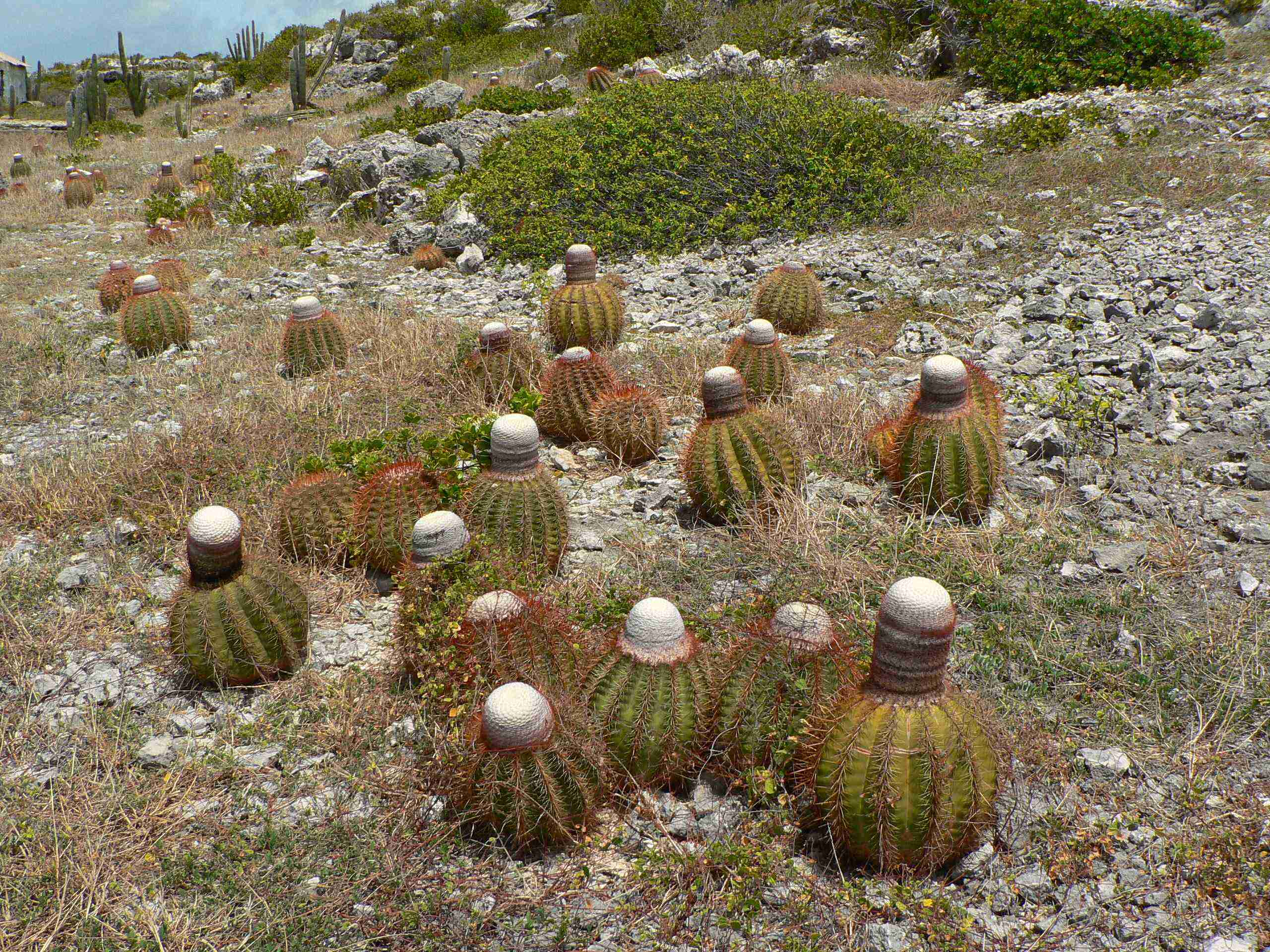
Bushi (Melocactus macracanthos)

== Notable sites and landmarks ==
=== North conservation zone ===
- Daimari: the northernmost point of Arikok National Park, is a bay formed by the erosion of the Daimari dry riverbed and the waves along the north coast. Heavy rainfall can wash white sand into the sea, but the beach undergoes a gradual restoration as waves bring the sand back over time.
- Moro: occasionally dubbed "Little Aruba" due to its topographical resemblance to the island's outline, stands as a geological formation shaped by the erosion of a limestone plateau by two dry riverbeds known as rooi. These natural processes have resulted in the formation of two distinct bays, named Boca Keto to the north and Boca Fluit to the south, flanking the prominent rock.
- Conchi (Natural Pool)

=== Central activity zone ===
- Visitor center
- Cunucu Arikok: Remains of an old farm where various plants were cultivated. There are still cactus hedges and stonewalls visible.
- Seroe Arikok (Arikok Hill): A viewpoint from where you can see much of the island.
- Fontein Cave: A limestone cave with brownish-red pictographs probably left behind by the Arawak tribe, as well as some more recent "wall art" made by early European settlers.
- Boca Prins: Beach where turtles nest and a small bar/cafe. The exoplanet WASP-39b was given its official name "Bocaprins" after this place by the IAU.
- Dos Playa: Relatively calm seas, it is possible to surf or bodyboard here.
- Hofi Shon Shoco: a garden with the local flora and fauna, such as the Candelabra cactus (Pilosocereus lanunginosus).
- Rooi Tambu
- Plantage Prins (Prins Plantation)
- Seroe Cabai
- Miralamar

=== South conservation zone ===
- Jamanota
- Quadirikiri Cave
- Vader Piet
- Rooi Prins
- Masiduri

== Threats to National Park ==
=== Livestock conflict ===
In Arikok National Park, herbivory affects the decline in vegetation cover, rendering bare soils vulnerable to wind and water erosion. This issue is often attributed to the trampling and grazing of livestock.

=== Human conflict ===
Simultaneously, Off Road Driving (ORD) has a negative impact on the surrounding environment, affecting both social and ecological aspects.

==== Dust impact on vegetation ====
ORD generates dust clouds that harm native vegetation, negatively impacting the ecosystem. Dust impact analyses and studies reveal muddy layers on vegetation, reduced leaf abundance, and overall degradation of flora in off-road dust-affected areas. Dust impacts extend over 200 metres (660 ft) from the road, affecting Parke Nacional Arikok. Experiments comparing flora in high and low ORD-impacted areas demonstrate significant differences. Continued ORD on the road to Conchi poses a risk of desertification in the San Fuego to Conchi area.

==== ORD engine oil spill ====
ORD engine oil spill has been documented on ORD roads in the National Park. Engine oil pollution, known for its mutagenic and carcinogenic properties, adversely alters the environment, leading to diminished ecosystem functionality. This pollution negatively impacts soil quality and obstructs plant growth by altering soil nutrient composition and reducing seedling viability.

== Other designated sites ==
The FPNA is an independent organization overseeing a significant portion of Aruba, including Arikok National Park and Spanish Lagoon. This includes marine park Aruba and other designated terrestrial areas (see Conservation geography of Aruba), covering approximately 25% of Aruba's total surface area.
