= Aruba First Mosque =

Mosque in Savaneta, Aruba

- 1ste Aruba-moskee
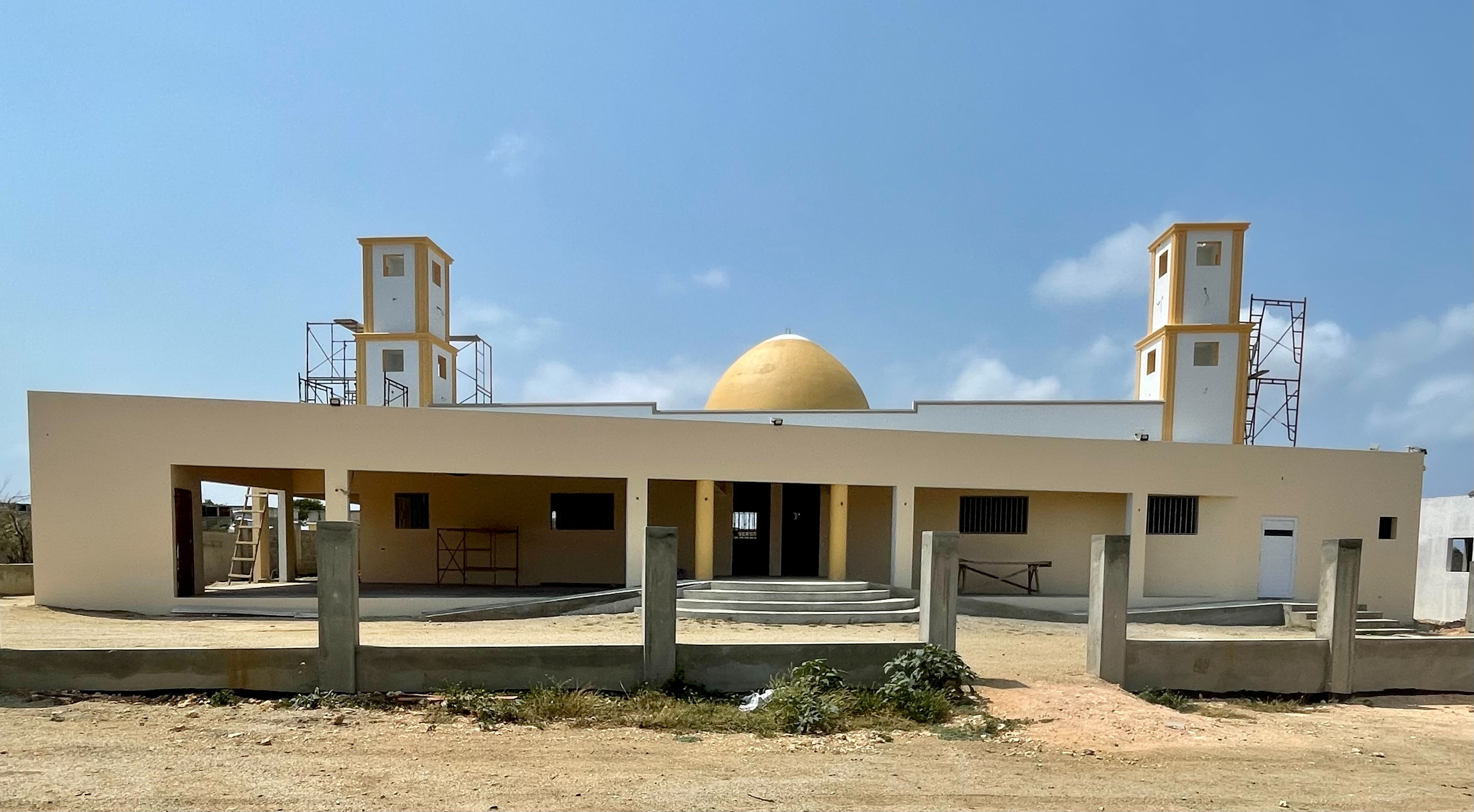

Religion
- Affiliation: Islam
- Year consecrated: 2020-2023

Location
- Location: Savaneta, Aruba
- Interactive map of Aruba First Mosque
- Coordinates: 12.4748°N 69.9567°W

Architecture
- Completed: 2023

Specifications
- Dome: 1
- Minaret: 2

The Aruba First Mosque (Dutch: 1ste Aruba-moskee) is located in Village of Savaneta, Aruba.

It is used by a local Muslim community, it's funded by the donation of Muslim community. It has one dome and two minarets.

It borders the Arikok National Park and the back it adjacent to the cemetery of Sabana Basora.
