= Prins Plantation =

Former coconut plantation in Aruba

- Plantage Prins (Dutch)
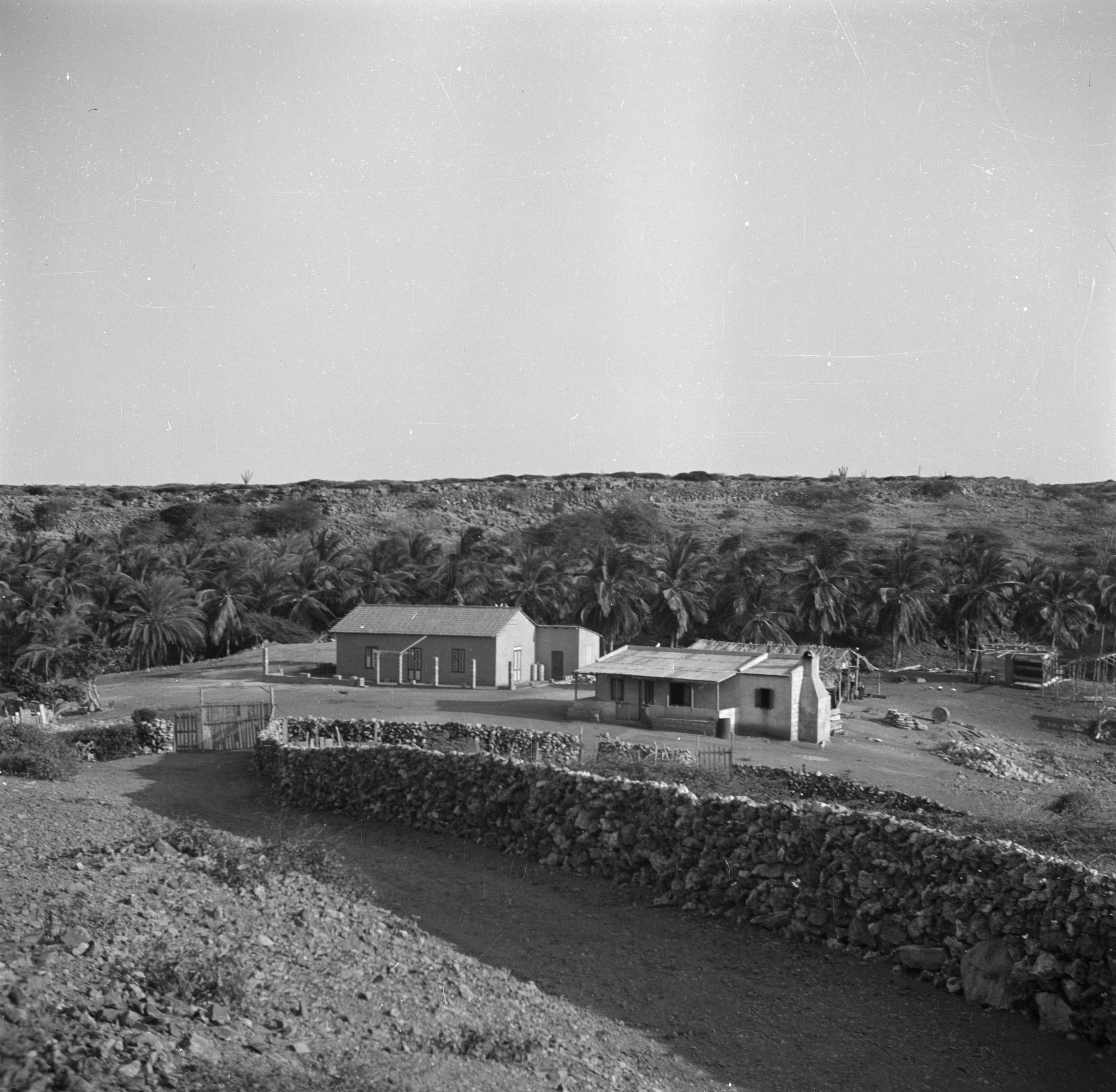
- Prins Plantation at Boca Prins (1947)
- Interactive map of Prins Plantation
- 12°29′42″N 69°54′40″W
- Location: Aruba

History
- Built: 1930s

Site notes
- Owner: Mokki Arends

Prins Plantation (Dutch: Plantage Prins), originally a coconut plantation in Aruba, saw its house reconstructed in the 1950s. The decline of palm trees, attributed to disease, led to the cessation of farm production.

In 1911, the Werbata-Jonckheer map identified Prins Plantation as one of 23 mostly small plantations characterized by mixed agriculture, coconut trees and housing. Additionally, a larger plantation was situated inland, north of Oranjestad in San Barbola, birthplace of Virginia Demetricia. The township Savaneta actually originated from a governmental plantation that later transformed into a small village.

== Etymology ==
The plantation derives its name from a Swedish mining engineer Paulus Printz, who lived in the area during the eighteenth century while searching for gold on behalf of the Administrators of the Chamber of Amsterdam of the Dutch West India Company. According to Van Raders' 1825 map, the ruin of his dwelling (№ 37) was located on the hilltop to the northwest of the plantation, but it has since disappeared. The hilltop, being exposed to the wind, was more favorable for habitation than the wind-sheltered arroyo. Printz worked in Aruba from June 14, 1725, to June 3, 1727, when he received an order from Amsterdam to cease the work.

== Overview ==
The original plantation house in the arroyo no longer stands, and the subsequent structure, a country house built in the 1930s, is now in a state of ruin.

Situated 2.5 kilometres (1.6 mi) from the visitor center and approximately 600 metres (0.37 mi) northwest from Plantage Fontein (Fontein Plantation) within Arikok National Park, a trail leads to the historic Prins Plantation, formerly owned by Mr. Mokki Arends, and two neighboring arroyos, Rooi Prins and Rooi Dwars. These arroyos once nurtured coconut and fruit trees. While the coconuts are gone, and only a few fruit trees remain, native vegetation thrives more densely than on the surrounding hills.

As of 2023, despite initial plans, the renovation and transformation of the Prins plantation ruins into the Prins Center, featuring demonstration projects on early plantation agricultural activity, has not yet occurred. The incorporation of the Prins Center into the new design of Arikok National Park remains pending. It is advisable to consider highlighting the historical significance of the Prins Center's namesake within the center itself.

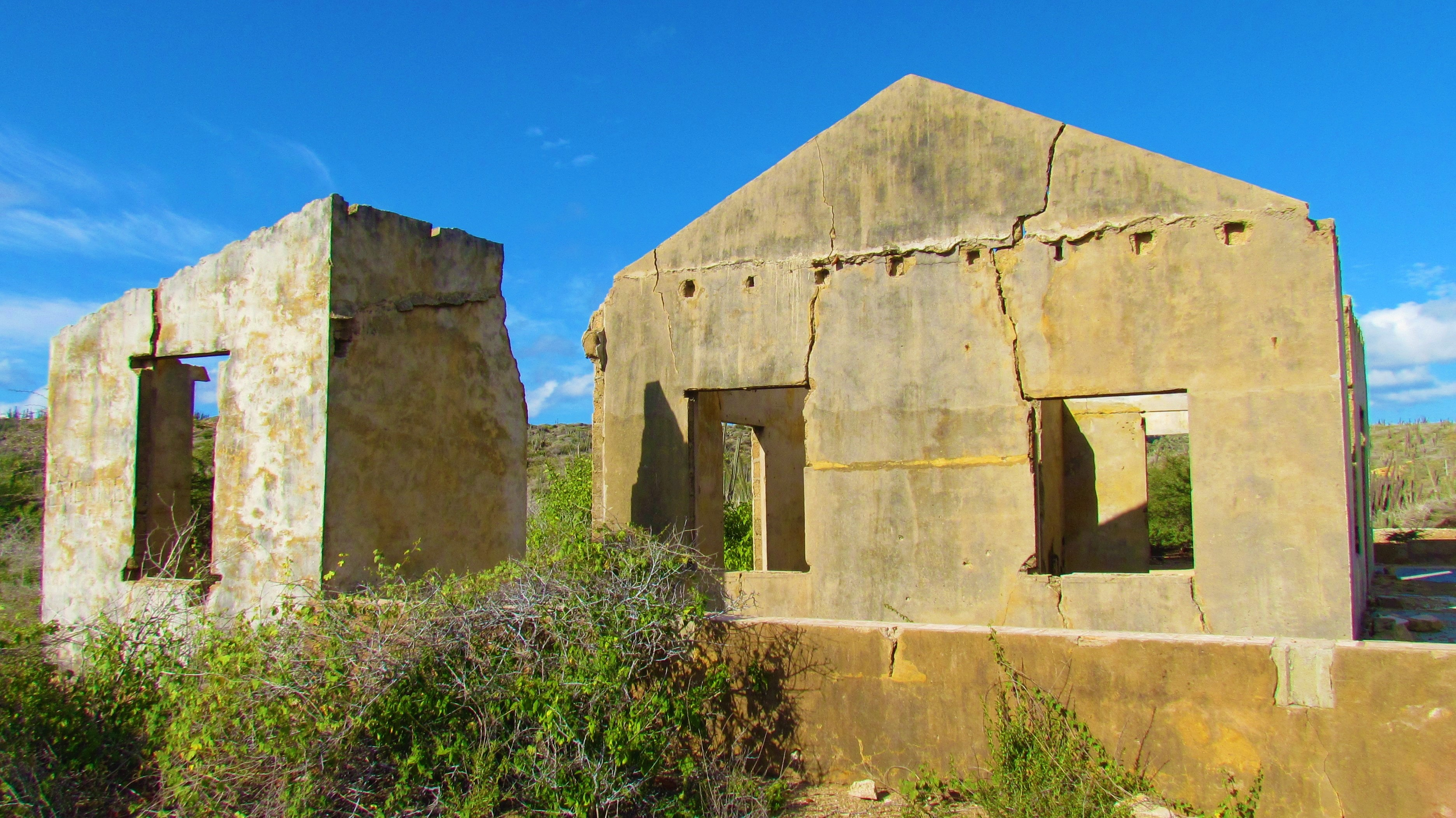
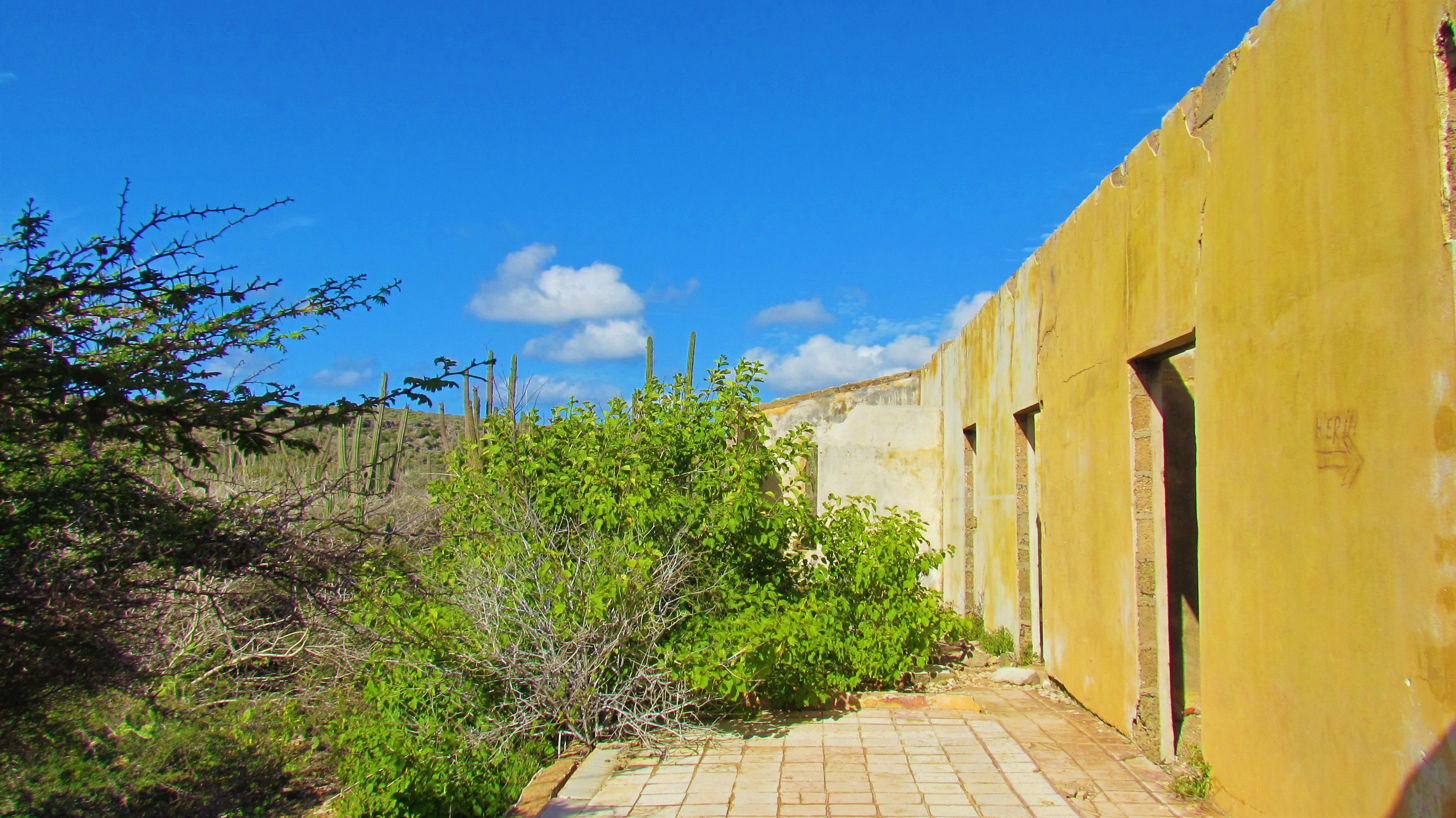
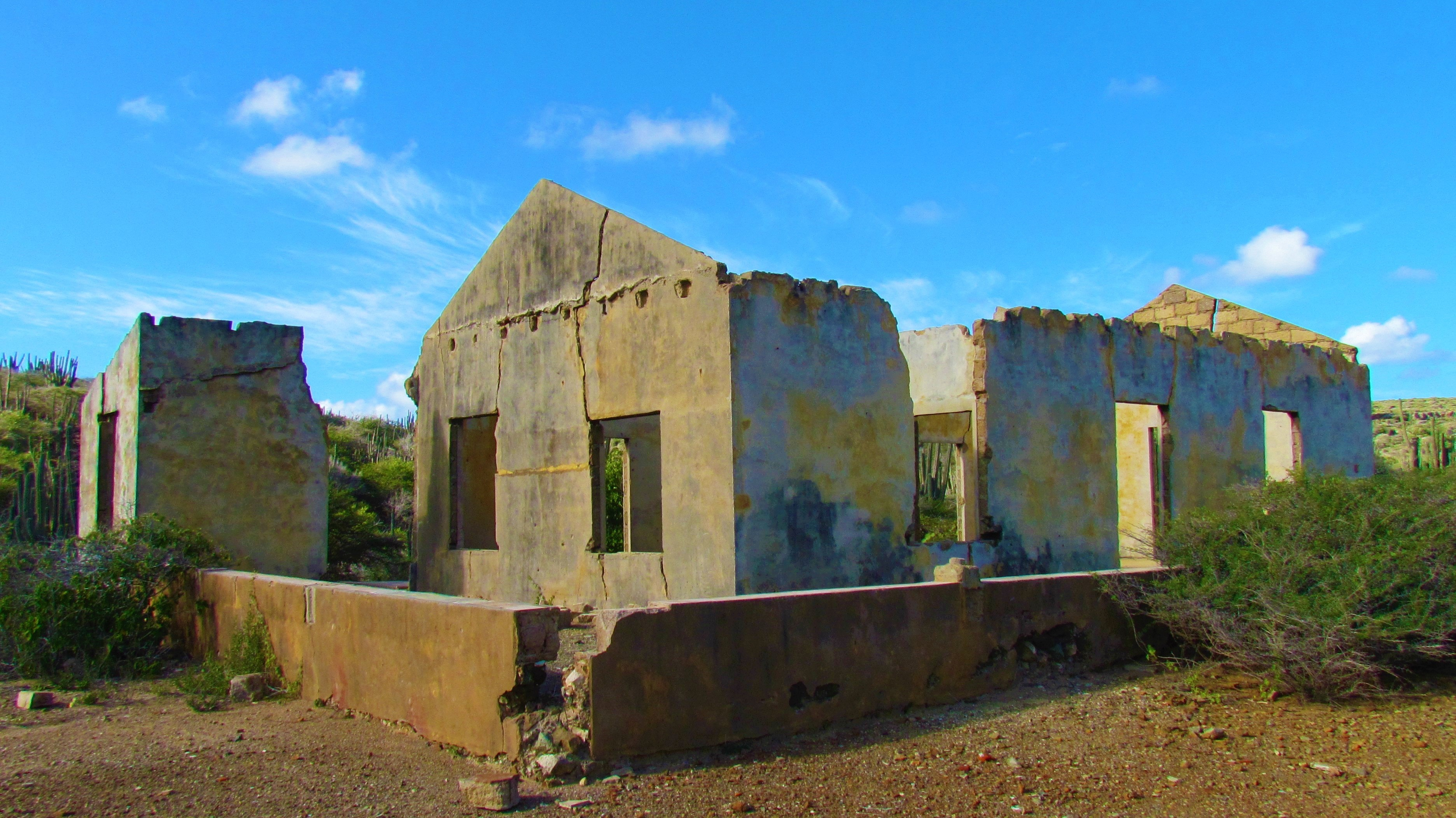
Country house ruins of Prins Plantation (2020)

== Sources ==
- Wells, Jeffrey V.; Wells, Allison Childs (2017). "Aruba". Birds of Aruba, Bonaire, and Curaçao: A site and field guide. Cornell University Press. pp. 32–38. ISBN 9781501701078.
- Klooster, Olga van der (2013). Monumentengids Aruba [Monument Guide Aruba] (in Dutch). Amsterdam : KIT Publishers; Oranjestad : Fundacion Editorial Charuba. pp. 38, 43. ISBN 9789460222207.
- Prins, Peter (1997). "Eindeloos getob? De expeditie van Paulus Printz". Arubaans Akkoord : Opstellen over Aruba van voor de komst van de olieindustrie [Aruban Agreement: Essay on Aruba before the arrival of the oil industry] (in Dutch). Bloemendaal: Stichting Libri Antilliani. pp. 127–134.
