= Natural Pool (Aruba) =

Tide pool in north-eastern Aruba

- Conchi or Cura di Tortuga
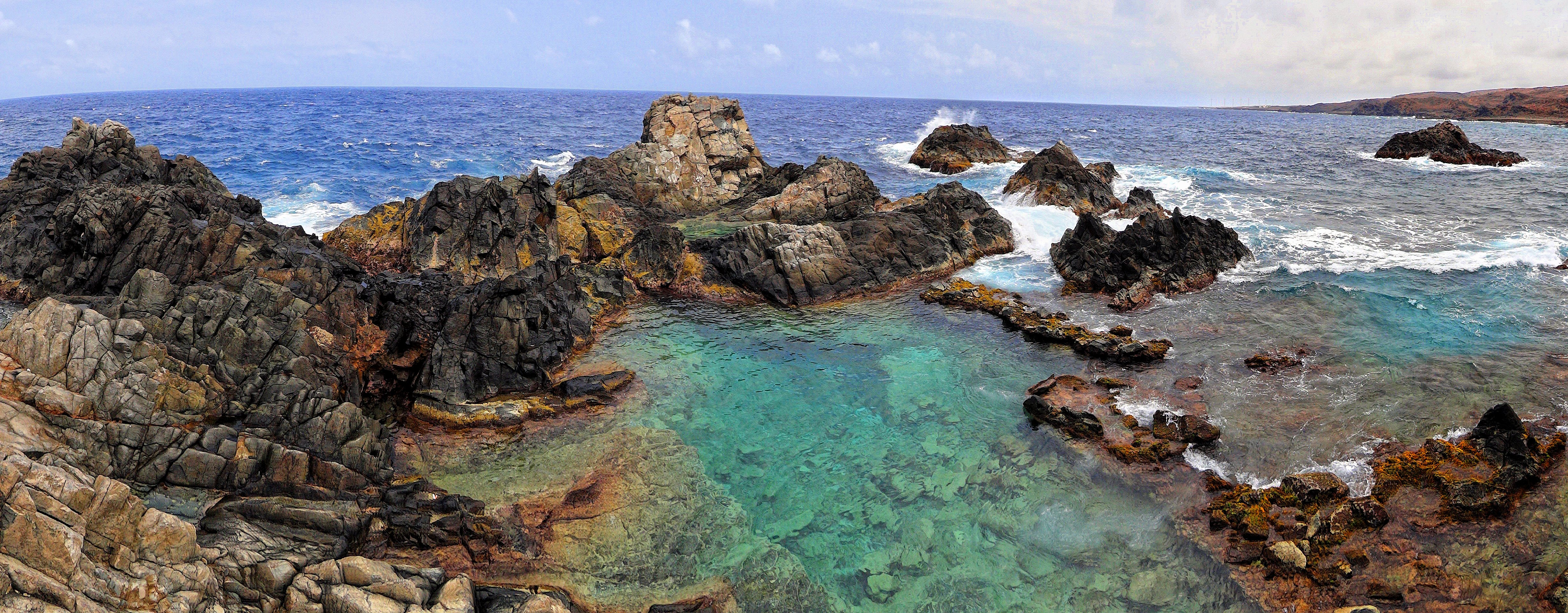
- The "Conchi" natural pool on the east coast of Aruba

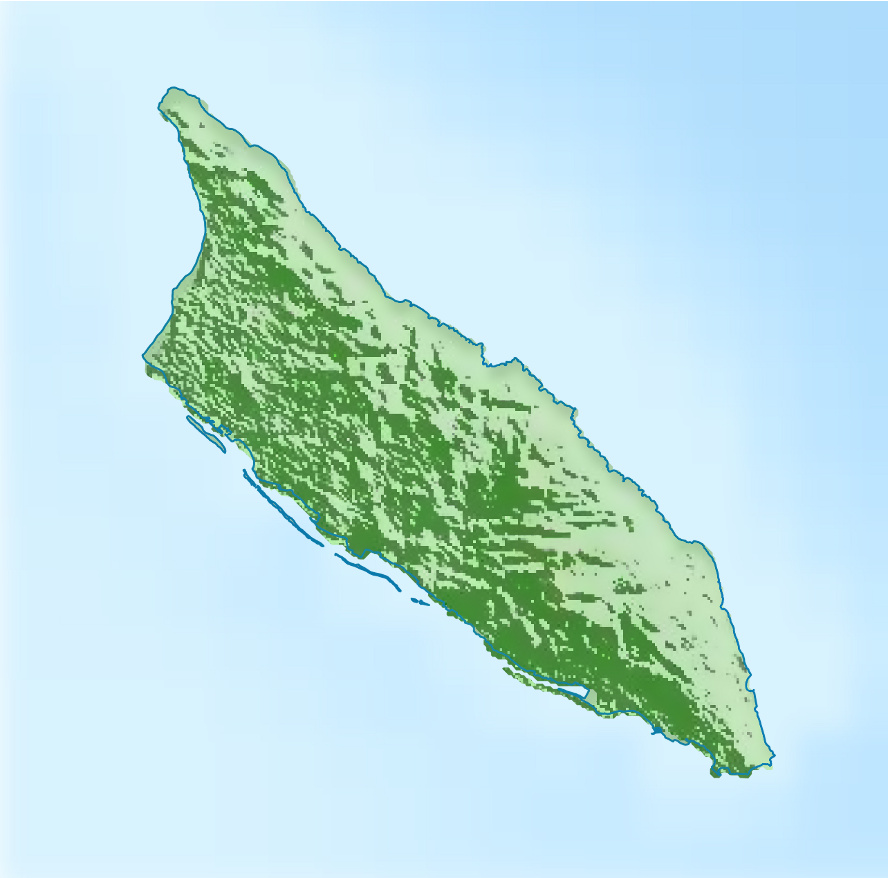
- Location in Aruba
- Location: Arikok National Park, Aruba
- Coordinates: 12.5246°N 69.9287°W

The Conchi, also referred to as Natural Pool or Cura di Tortuga ("Turtle Pen"), earned its name from the historical presence of turtles in the pool. This natural saltwater tide pool is situated in the North conservation zone of Arikok National Park.

Conchi is enclosed by geological pillow lava formations and can be reached by hiking, horseback riding, or four-wheel-drive vehicles (Threats to Arikok National Park).
