= Caves of Aruba =

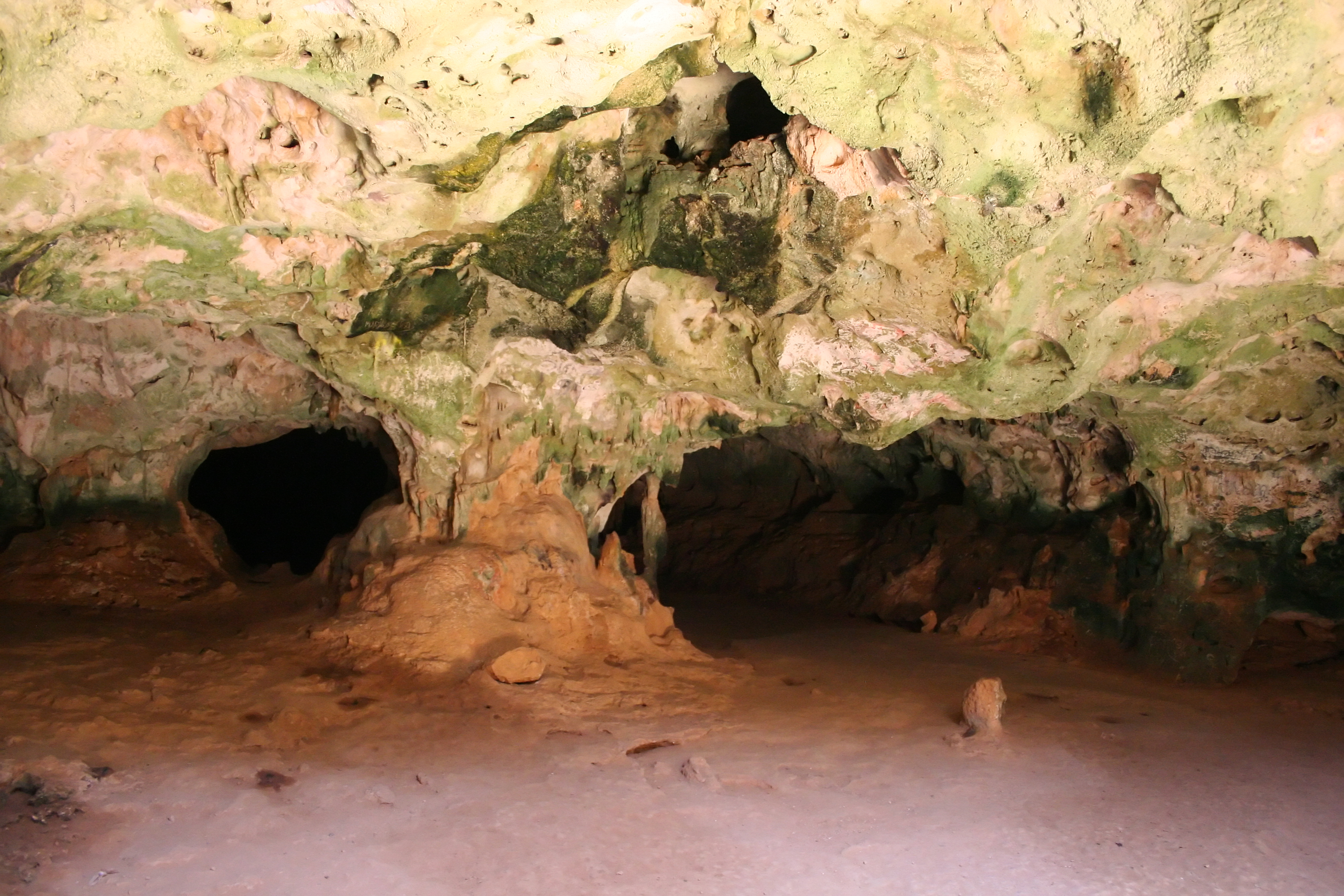
- Two large domes shaped entrance to the Guadirikiri Cave
- Location: Aruba
- Length: Guadirikiri Cave 98 feet (30 m); Fontein Cave 50 metres (164 ft); Huliba Cave 300 feet (91 m)
- Geology: Limestone

The caves of Aruba, located on the windward side within the Arikok National Park, comprise notable formations such as Quadirikiri Cave, Fontein Cave, and Huliba Cave. These subterranean environments serve as habitats for a variety of nocturnal bats, including insectivores and frugivores. The presence of these bats species is of ecological importance, contributing to the preservation of Aruba's biodiversity. Their role in controlling insect populations and aiding in pollination underscores their significance within the island's ecosystem.

== History ==
The history of Aruba unfolds in three phases of indigenous migration—the archaic age (2500 BC–AD 1000), Neo-indian period (AD 1000–1515), and the post-European colonial era marked by Spanish and Dutch settlements. The 1920s witnessed a significant transformation with the establishment of the Lago Oil and Transport Company and Arend Petroleum Company, ushering in a fourth wave of inhabitants.

Rock art sites are abundant and represent a rare aspect of Amerindian heritage preserved in their original context. Radiocarbon dating reveals a sequential occupation of Curaçao, Bonaire, and Aruba from the Venezuelan coast around 2500 BC. On Aruba, a paint sample from one site yields a transitional date of A.D. 1000, marking the shift from Late Archaic to Early Ceramic periods. Although some Archaic pictographs are present on Aruba, the majority were likely created during the Ceramic Period. The rock paintings were created and utilized by ancient communities for ceremonial and religious purposes. Aruba's current rock art collection comprises 300 to 350 individual representations spread across 22 sites, five of the 22 sites occur in the northeastern coast limestone caves.

== Caves ==
=== Quadirikiri Cave ===
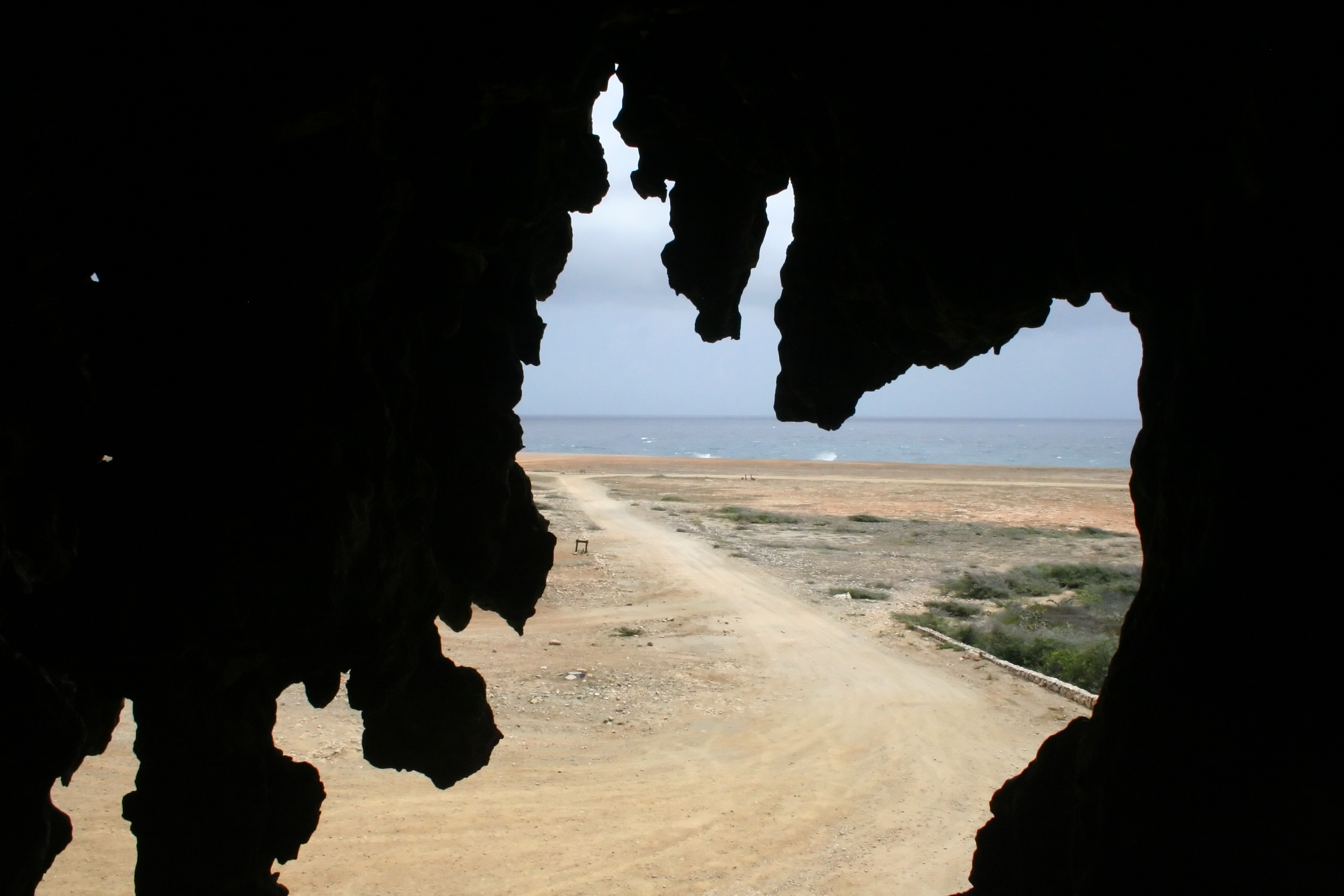
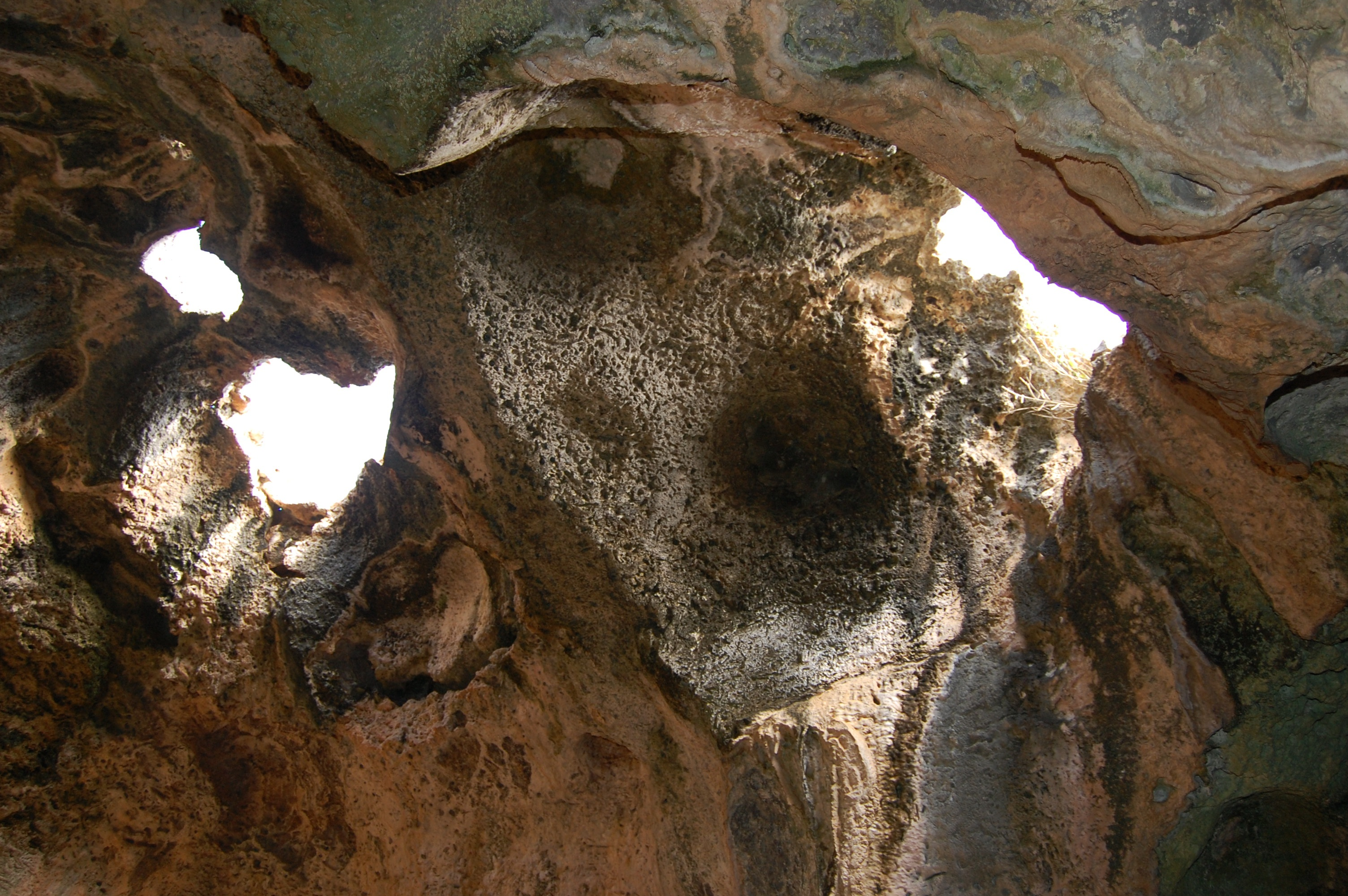
Left: View from Guadirikiri Cave. Right: Holes in the roof of the cave

The Quadirikiri Cave is notable for its two large dome-shaped chambers which are illuminated with sunlight through holes in the ceiling. Entry to the cave is at the base of the cliff. This 492-foot (150 m) long cave is also a nesting site for numerous small nocturnal bats, which are harmless. In order to preserve the natural habitat of the cave for the bats to breed, one of the caves is barred for visitors.

According to a local folk tale, the cave is associated with the story of an Indian chief's daughter who fell in love with someone her father did not approve of. In consequence, she was confined within the cave, while her beloved was imprisoned in a nearby cave called Huliba Cave, also known as the "Tunnel of Love." In an underground rendezvous, both lovers managed to meet. The legend goes that they eventually died within the cave, and their spirits ascended to heaven through the openings in the cave's roof.

=== Fontein Cave ===
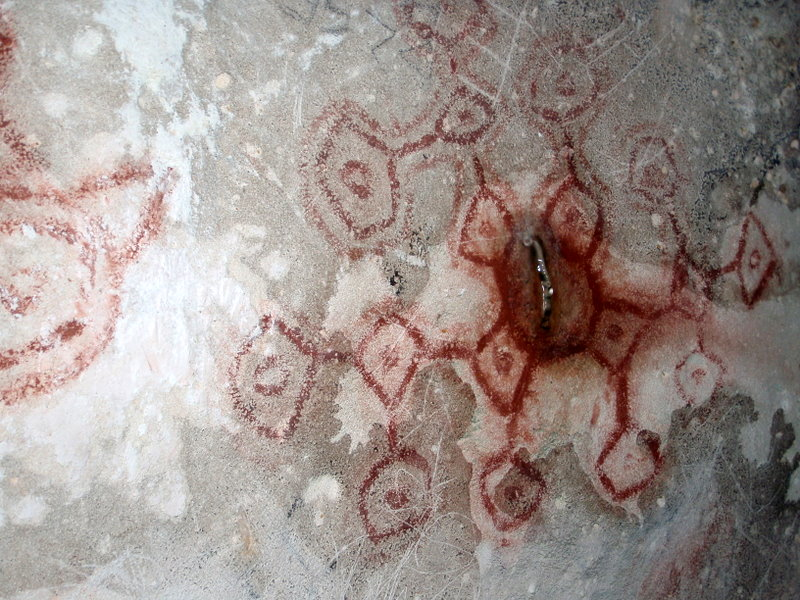
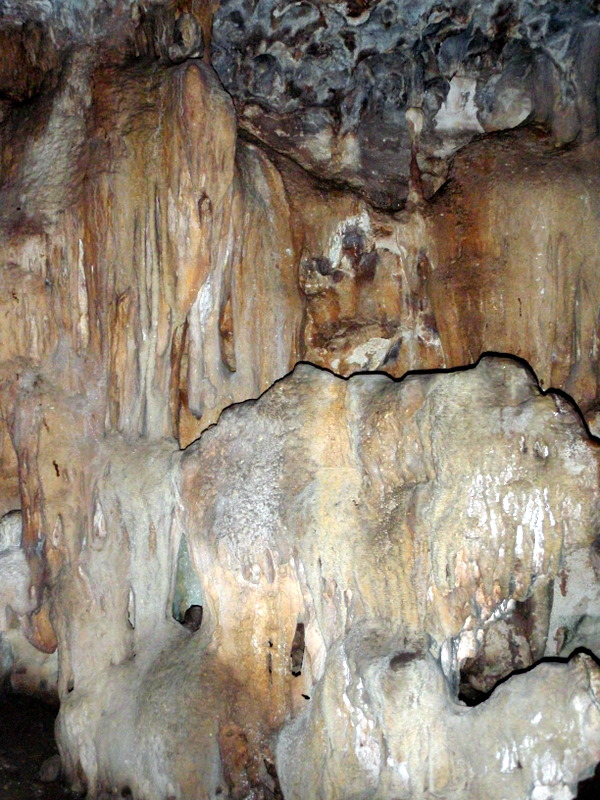
Left: Graphic Indian paintings in Fontein Cave. Right: Stalagmites and stalactites in the shape of screaming monster and buffalo

The Fontein Cave is a small cave near Boca Prins on the northern part of the island. It is well known for its native Arawak drawings on the wall, which were decoratively etched by Amerindians on the stones walls and flatter roof portion of the cave in brownish-red colour or reddish brown or purplish colour; this in turn gives a clue to the history of the Amerindians. The cave is accessible from an "escarpment of a terrace of coral limestone" and has a width of 3 metres (9.8 ft) and a height of 2 metres (6 ft 7 in). The entrance hall, which is open for visitors, is 4 metres (13 ft) in height and extends to a depth of 50 metres (160 ft). As it is in limestone geological formation, solution effect due to seeping water has resulted in colourful stalagmites and stalactites formations in very odd shapes and sizes. Long tongued bats nestle in the holes of the cave which go on their nocturnal hunt to collect and feed on food in the form of nectar and pollen. It is also reported that Arawak Indians used to perform their tribal rituals and ceremonies inside this cave.

=== Huliba Cave ===
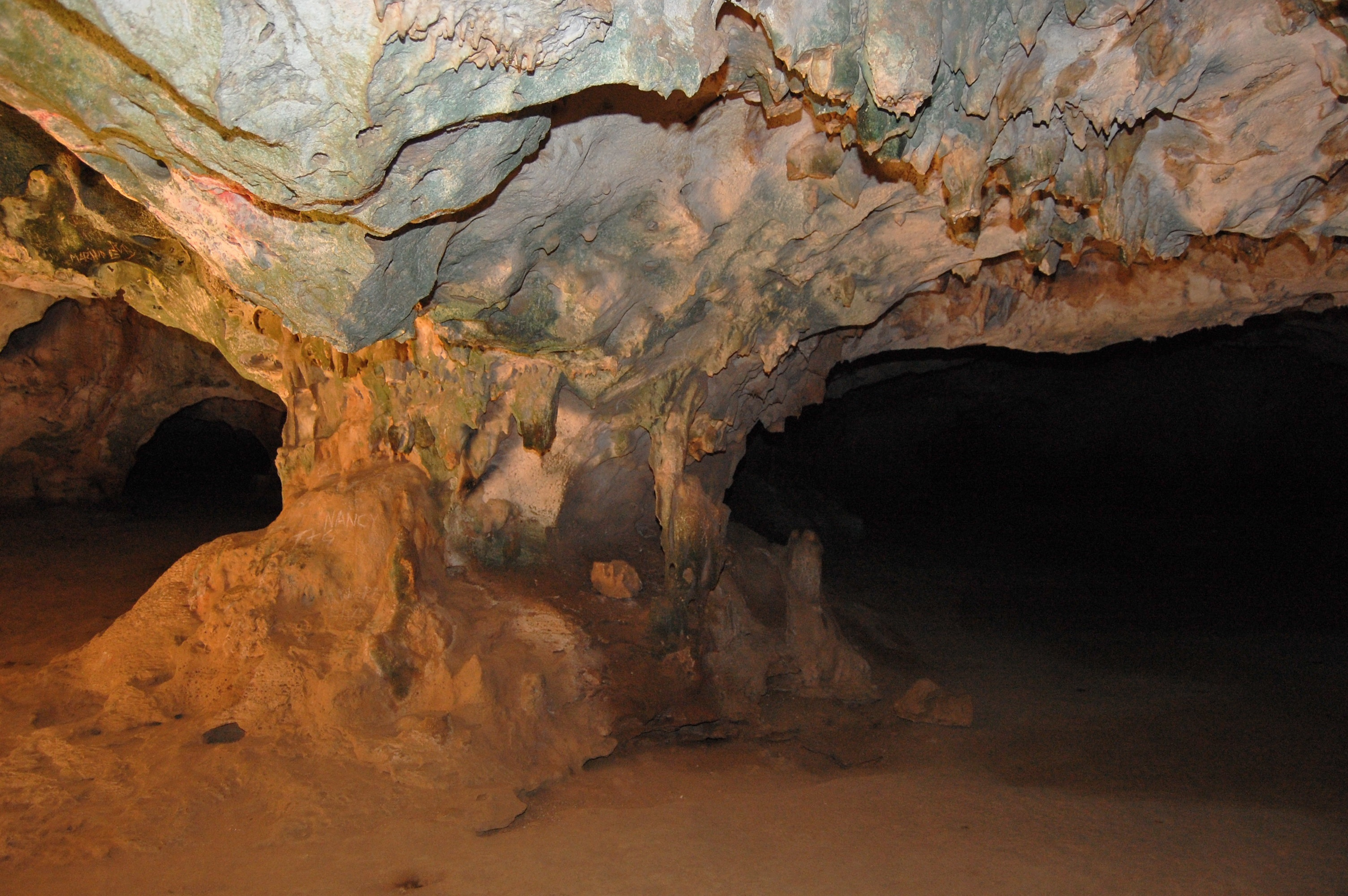
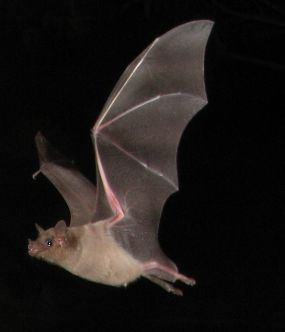
Left: Bats in Cave Formations. Right: Southern Long-nosed Bat (Leptonycteris curasoae) found in Aruba

The Huliba Cave (known as the "Baranca Sunu cave" also meaning "Naked Rock") is nicknamed the "Tunnel of Love" for its heart-shaped entrance. The entrance is through a steep and narrow stairway which dips into the cave. It has five entrances. At places, one has to crouch to see the formations. Flashlights are needed to explore the 300 feet (91 m) long passageway, as it is totally dark inside the cave. The cave is studded with stalagmites and stalactites formations in limestone rocks. Two bat species residing in this cave include the Southern Long-nosed Bat and long-tongued Fruit Bat. It is interesting to watch when the bats, after sleeping in the caves during the day time, fly out in hordes in search of food. The exit from the tunnel is through a series of steps that are carved on the rock face and are quite risky. In one of the chambers, the Virgin Mary has been carved in the natural rock formation. Legend mentions about pirates inhabiting the cave to hide their treasures, though there is no proof to confirm this.

== Postage stamps recognition ==
In a testament to their cultural and national significance, the caves of Aruba, specifically Quadirikiri Cave, Fontein Cave, and Huliba Cave, were honored with the issuance of postage stamps by Post Aruba in April 2009. This recognition serves as a symbolic acknowledgment of the unique geological and ecological value these caves hold for the island. The 175 cents stamp features Baranca Sunu Cave, the 200 cents stamp showcases Fontein Cave, and the 225 cents stamp highlights the entrance of Quadirikiri Cave. Such stamps not only commemorate the geological wonders but also contribute to the broader cultural identity of Aruba.

== Gallery ==
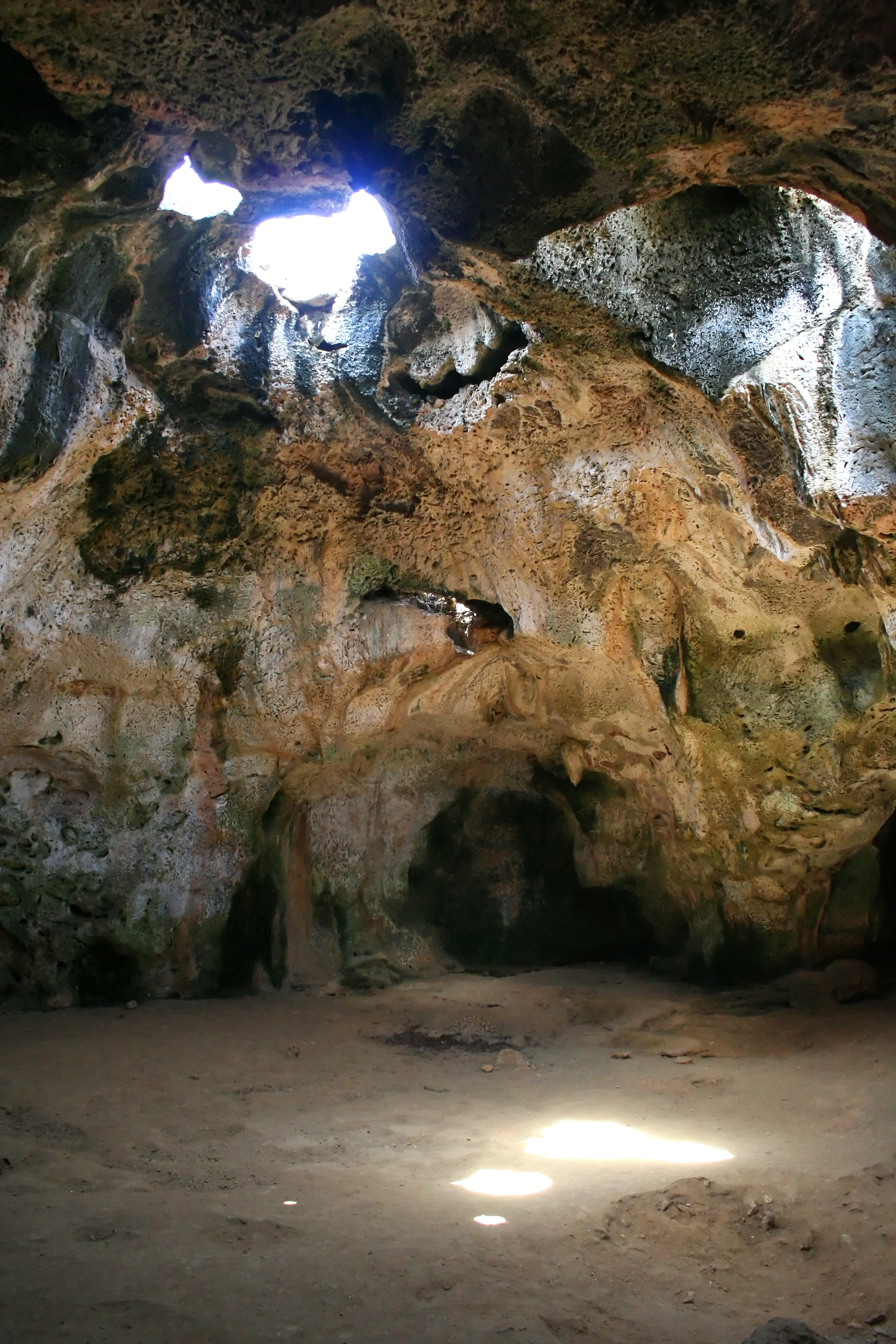

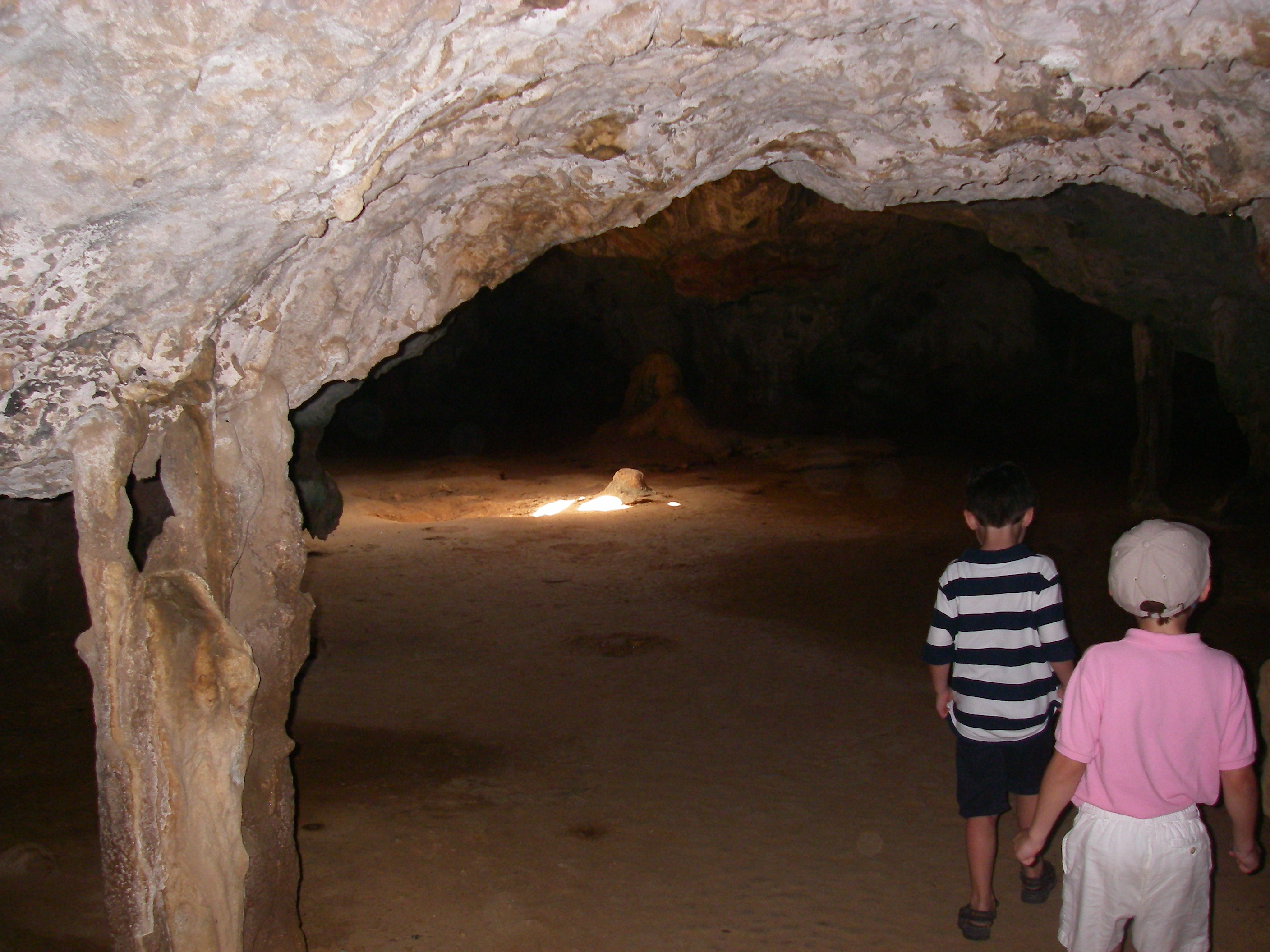

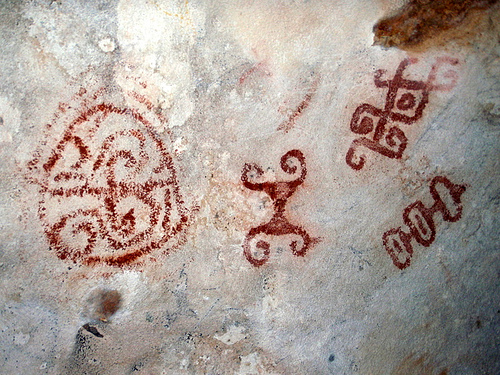
