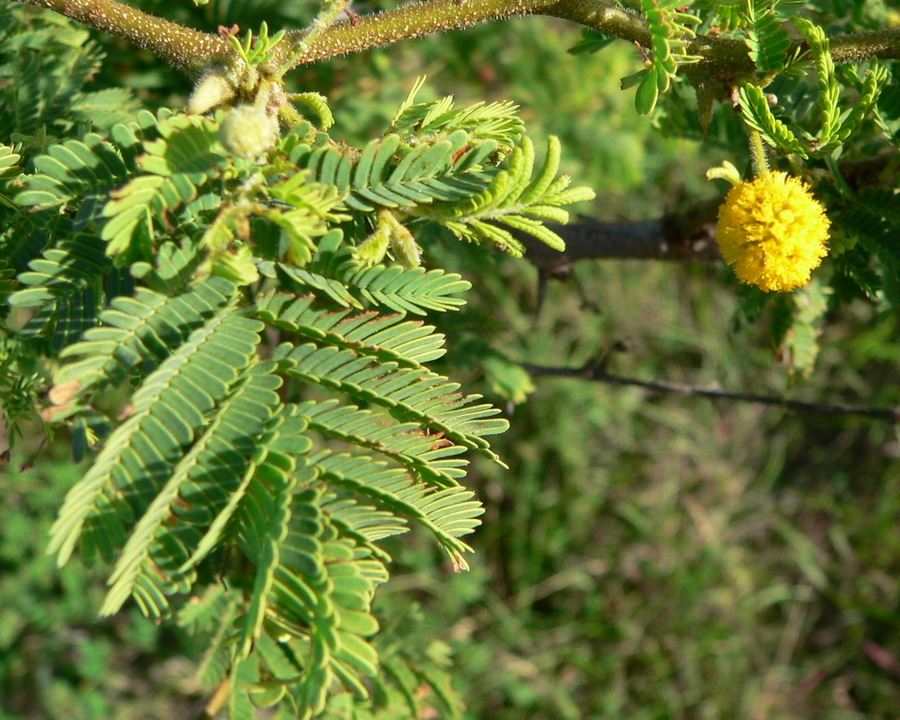

Conservation status
- Least Concern (IUCN 3.1)

Scientific classification
- Kingdom: Plantae
- Clade: Tracheophytes
- Clade: Angiosperms
- Clade: Eudicots
- Clade: Rosids
- Order: Fabales
- Family: Fabaceae
- Subfamily: Caesalpinioideae
- Clade: Mimosoid clade
- Genus: Vachellia
- Species: V. tortuosa

Binomial name
- Vachellia tortuosa (L.) Seigler & Ebinger

Synonyms
- Acacia leucacantha Bertero; Acacia seifriziana León; Acacia tortuosa (L.) Willd.; Acacia virescens DC.; Mimosa salinarum Rohr ex Benth.; Mimosa tortuosa L.; Poponax tortuosa (L.) Raf.

= Vachellia tortuosa =

Species of legume

Vachellia tortuosa, the twisted acacia , poponax or huisachillo, is a woody, leguminous thorn tree of the Caribbean, Florida, southern Texas, northeastern and central Mexico, and northern South America. It is found in tropical and desert habitats, such as the Rio Grande Valley, Central Mexican Plateau, and Colombian Tatacoa Desert.

== Description ==
Vachellia tortuosa is a shrub - small tree to 1–2 metres (3.3–6.6 ft) tall.

- Stipular spines: may be fused at bases.
- Leaves: compound, 4-8 pairs of segments, 15-20 pairs of leaflets; petiolar gland elliptic.
- Yellow flowers; stamens numerous.
- Fruit: a slender moniliform, slightly curved.

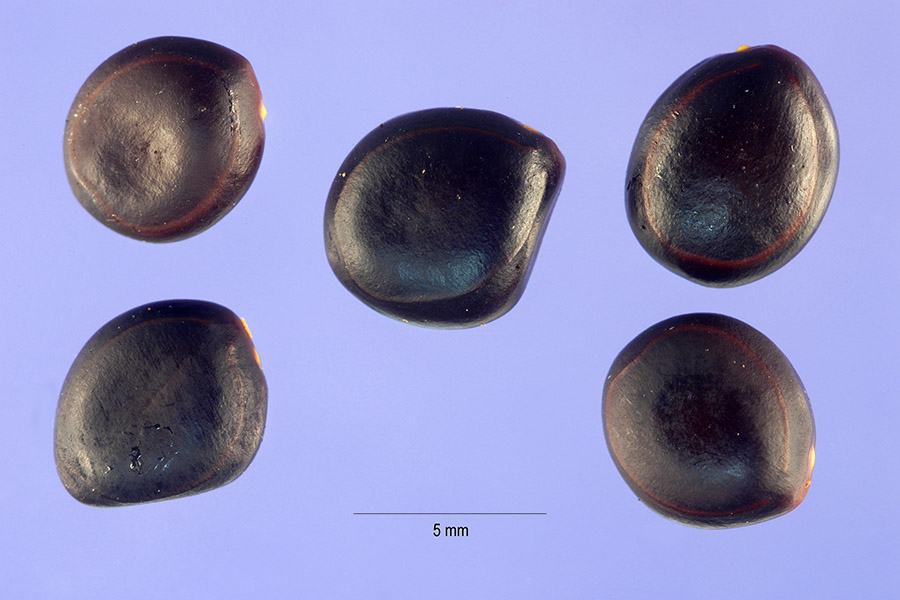
Vachellia tortuosa seeds
