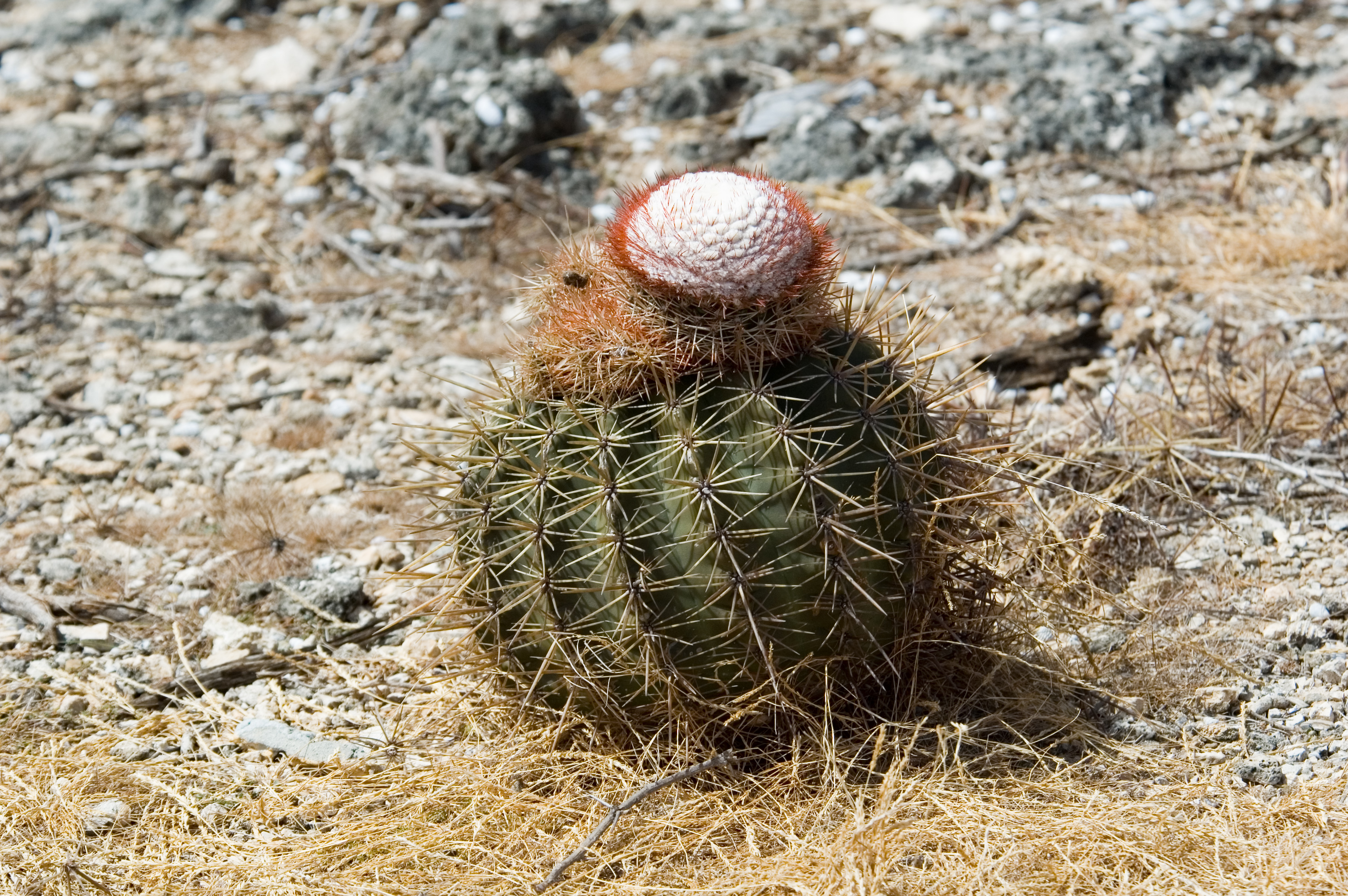

Conservation status
- Least Concern (IUCN 3.1)

Scientific classification
- Kingdom: Plantae
- Clade: Tracheophytes
- Clade: Angiosperms
- Clade: Eudicots
- Order: Caryophyllales
- Family: Cactaceae
- Subfamily: Cactoideae
- Genus: Melocactus
- Species: M. macracanthos

Binomial name
- Melocactus macracanthos (Salm-Dyck) Link & Otto

Synonyms
- List: Cactus macracanthos Salm-Dyck 1820; Cactus microcephalus (Miq.) Borg 1951; Cactus parvispinus Haw. 1819; Cactus pyramidalis Salm-Dyck 1820; Cactus zuccarinii (Miq.) Borg 1937; Echinocactus armatus Salm-Dyck 1834; Echinocactus fischeri Pfeiff. 1837; Echinocactus parvispinus (Haw.) DC. 1828; Echinocactus salmianus Link & Otto 1827; Echinocactus spina-christi Zucc. ex Pfeiff. 1837; Melocactus aciculosus Valck.Sur. 1901; Melocactus aciculosus var. adauctus Valck.Sur. 1901; Melocactus angusticostatus Suringar 1885 publ. 1886; Melocactus approximatus Suringar 1885 publ. 1886; Melocactus arcuatus Suringar 1889; Melocactus baarsianus Suringar 1889; Melocactus barbarana Antesb. 1988; Melocactus bargei Valck.Sur. 1901; Melocactus buysianus Valck.Sur. 1901; Melocactus capillaris Suringar 1889; Melocactus citrispinus Antesb. 1990; Melocactus contortus Suringar 1889; Melocactus cordatus Valck.Sur. 1910; Melocactus cornutus Suringar 1885 publ. 1886; Melocactus cylindricus Valck.Sur. 1910; Melocactus dilatatus Suringar 1889; Melocactus elongatus Suringar 1889; Melocactus euryacanthus Suringar 1889; Melocactus evertszianus Suringar 1885 publ. 1886; Melocactus extensus Suringar 1889; Melocactus ferox Suringar 1885 publ. 1886; Melocactus ferox Suringar 1885 publ. 1886; Melocactus ferox Pfeiff. ex C.F.Först. 1846; Melocactus firmus Valck.Sur. 1901; Melocactus flammeus Suringar 1889; Melocactus flavispinus Suringar 1889; Melocactus flexilis Suringar 1889; Melocactus flexus Suringar 1889; Melocactus gilvispinus Valck.Sur. 1901; Melocactus gilvispinus var. planispinus Valck.Sur. 1901; Melocactus gracilis Valck.Sur. 1910; Melocactus grandis Valck.Sur. 1910; Melocactus grandispinus Valck.Sur. 1910; Melocactus hexacanthus Suringar 1885 publ. 1886; Melocactus inclinatus Antesb. 1995; Melocactus incurvus Suringar 1889; Melocactus inflatus Suringar 1889; Melocactus intermedius Suringar 1885 publ. 1886; Melocactus intermedius var. laticostatus Valck.Sur. 1901; Melocactus intermedius var. rotundatus Valck.Sur. 1910; Melocactus intermedius var. tenuispinus Valck.Sur. 1901; Melocactus inversus Valck.Sur. 1901; Melocactus laui Antesb. 1991; Melocactus lehmannii Miq. 1837; Melocactus leucacanthus Suringar 1889; Melocactus limis Suringar 1889; Melocactus linkii Valck.Sur. 1896; Melocactus lutescens Valck.Sur. 1910; Melocactus macracanthos f. elegans Suringar 1885 publ. 1886; Melocactus macracanthos var. miacanthus Valck.Sur. 1901; Melocactus macrocanthus Miq. 1837; Melocactus microcarpus Valck.Sur. 1910; Melocactus microcephalus Miq. 1841; Melocactus microcephalus var. olivascens Suringar 1889; Melocactus obliquus Suringar 1889; Melocactus obliquus f. quadrispina Suringar 1889; Melocactus obovatus Suringar 1889; Melocactus ovatus Suringar 1889; Melocactus pachycentrus Valck.Sur. 1901; Melocactus parvispinus Suringar 1885 publ. 1886; Melocactus patens Suringar 1885 publ. 1886; Melocactus pinguis Valck.Sur. 1901; Melocactus pinguis var. areolosus Valck.Sur. 1910; Melocactus pinguis var. laticostatus Valck.Sur. 1910; Melocactus pinguis var. planispinus Valck.Sur. 1910; Melocactus pinguis var. tenuissimus Valck.Sur. 1910; Melocactus pulvinosus Suringar 1889; Melocactus pusillus Suringar 1885 publ. 1886; Melocactus pyramidalis (Salm-Dyck) Link & Otto 1827; Melocactus pyramidalis var. compressus Valck.Sur. 1910; Melocactus rectiusculus Suringar 1885 publ. 1886; Melocactus reticulatus Suringar 1889; Melocactus reversus Suringar 1885 publ. 1886; Melocactus rotifer Suringar 1897; Melocactus rotifer Suringar 1897; Melocactus rotifer var. angustior Valck.Sur. 1910; Melocactus rotula var. angusticostatus Valck.Sur. 1910; Melocactus rotula var. validispinus Valck.Sur. 1910; Melocactus rubellus Suringar 1885 publ. 1886; Melocactus rudis Suringar 1889; Melocactus rufispinus Bertol. 1839; Melocactus rufispinus f. aplanatus Valck.Sur. 1910; Melocactus rufispinus f. crassispinus Valck.Sur. 1910; Melocactus rufispinus f. curvispinus Valck.Sur. 1910; Melocactus rufispinus f. elongatus Valck.Sur. 1910; Melocactus rufispinus f. laticostatus Valck.Sur. 1910; Melocactus rufispinus f. paucispinus Valck.Sur. 1910; Melocactus rufispinus f. pluriareolatus Valck.Sur. 1910; Melocactus rufispinus f. pluricostatus-prurispinus Valck.Sur. 1910; Melocactus salmianus Link & Otto 1827; Melocactus salmianus var. adauctus Suringar 1889; Melocactus salmianus var. contractus Suringar 1889; Melocactus salmianus var. spectabilis Valck.Sur. 1901; Melocactus sordidus Suringar 1889; Melocactus spatanginus Suringar 1885 publ. 1886; Melocactus spatanginus f. tenuispinus Suringar 1885 publ. 1886; Melocactus spatangus Pfeiff. 1837; Melocactus stellatus Suringar 1889; Melocactus stramineus f. pluricostatus Suringar 1889; Melocactus tenuissimus Valck.Sur. 1910; Melocactus trigonaster Valck.Sur. 1910; Melocactus zuccarinii Miq. 1837

= Melocactus macracanthos =

Species of cactus

Melocactus macracanthos is a species of Melocactus found in Aruba.
