= Opuntia caracassana =

Scientific classification
- Kingdom: Plantae
- Clade: Tracheophytes
- Clade: Angiosperms
- Clade: Eudicots
- Order: Caryophyllales
- Family: Cactaceae
- Genus: Opuntia
- Species: O. caracassana

Binomial name
- Opuntia caracassana Salm-Dyck

Species of plant

Opuntia caracassana is a species from the genus Opuntia. The species was originally described by Joseph zu Salm-Reifferscheidt-Dyck in 1850.

== Description ==
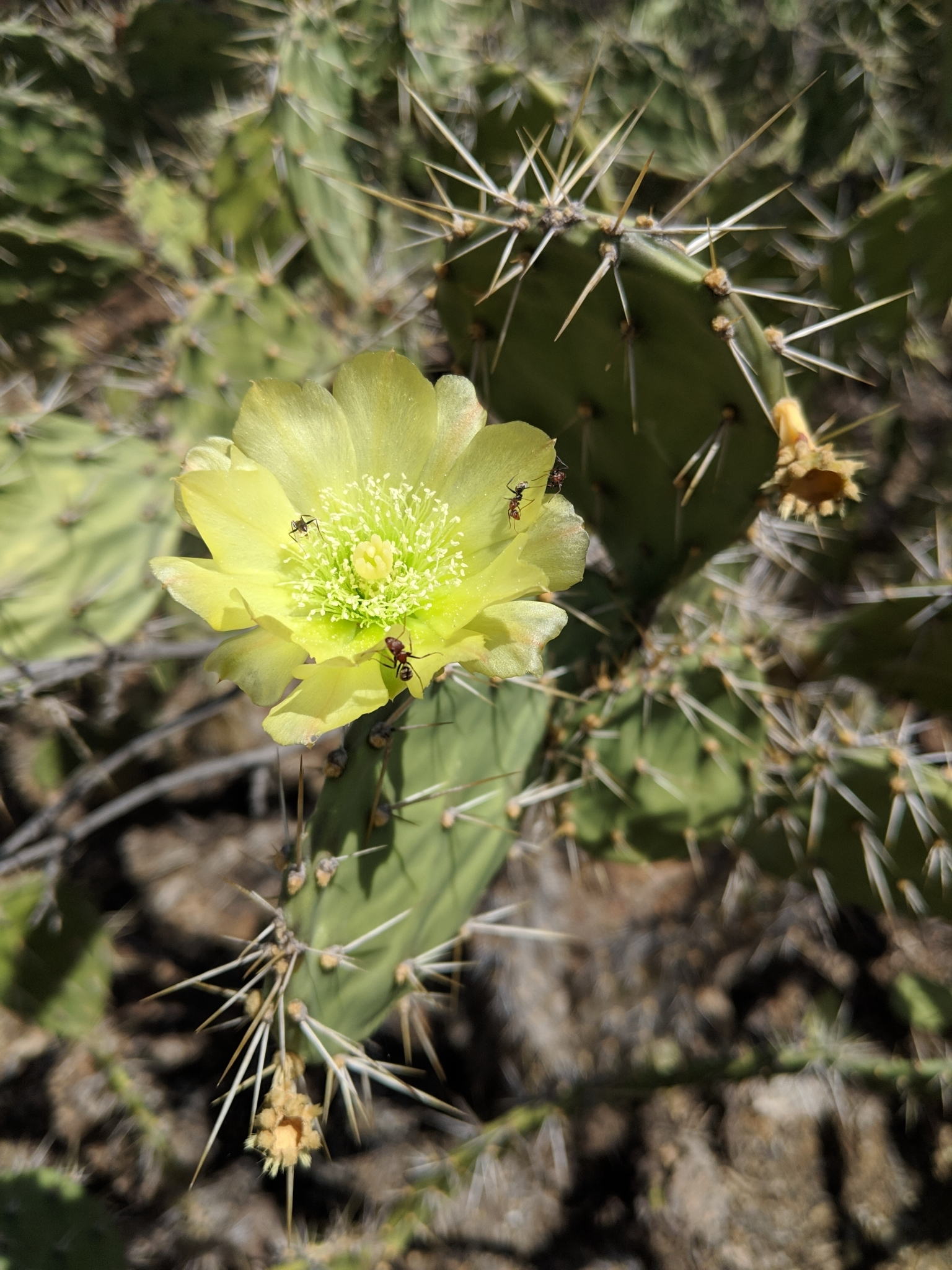

Opuntia caracassana tends to erect up to 1 m (3.3 ft) in height. The flowers are yellow and the fruit is small and red.

=== Juvenile ===
Young specimens have obovate or round cladodes between 5 and 12 cm long and up to 6 cm wide. The cladodes are also clearly green. The spines of the young specimens are subulate and white with a yellow base. The points are either dark or completely yellow. 1.0–4.0 cm long, Its spikes are described as divaricate. The spikes can have one to two radial spikes 1 to 1.5 cm long.

=== Adults ===

Full-grown specimens have also obovate or round cladodes grown up to 15–17 cm long and 10–12 cm wide. There are one to two white central spines with a brown tip which are 2.5-5.5 cm long. They are also described as being divaricated and subulate and with a white tip. There are one to three radial spines which are 0.5-3.5 cm long. The longest spines tend the squirm.

==== Areoles ====
The areoles are white, rounded. Its dimensions are 3 to 4 mm white and 2 to 3 mm high. With some the Glochids are not clearly visible.

==== Flowers ====
The flowers of the O. caracannana are 4.8 to 5 cm long. The perianth is 2.5 to 3 cm in diameter. The hypanthium is 3 cm in length.

==== Fruits ====
Fruits of the O. caracannana are small and red.

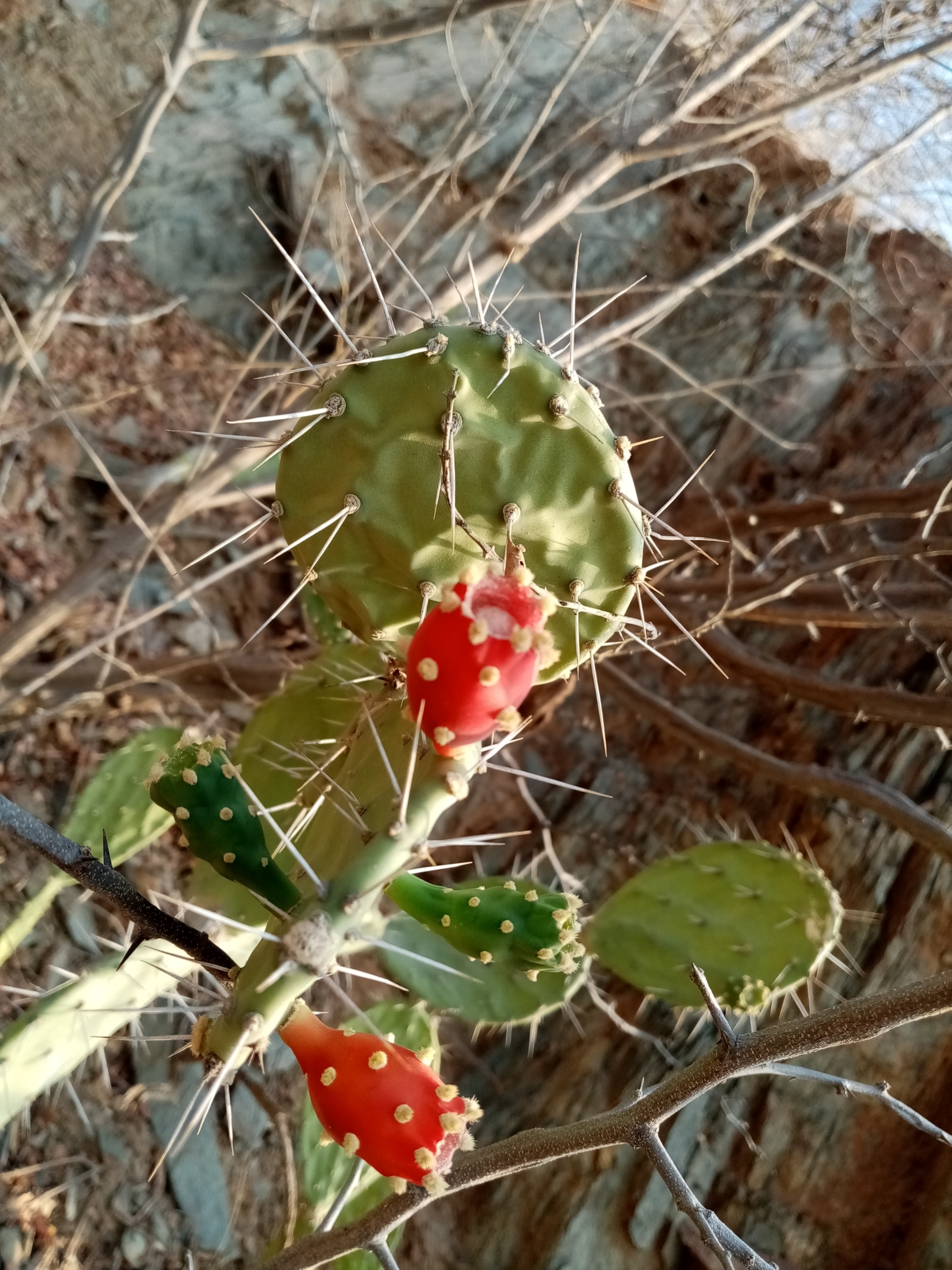

== Distribution and habitat ==
The distribution of the O. caracannana ranges from the neotropical regions between the north of South America and the Caribbean and specimens have notably been observed in Aruba, Colombia, Curaçao and Dutch Caribbean,. Citizen science projects also mentions specimens being found in Costa Rica and Venezuela.

== Taxonomy ==
Opuntia caracassana is also known by the following taxon names (synonyms):

- Opuntia pennellii
- Opuntia salvadorensis
- Opuntia wentiana
