= Jamanota =

Aruba's highest natural point

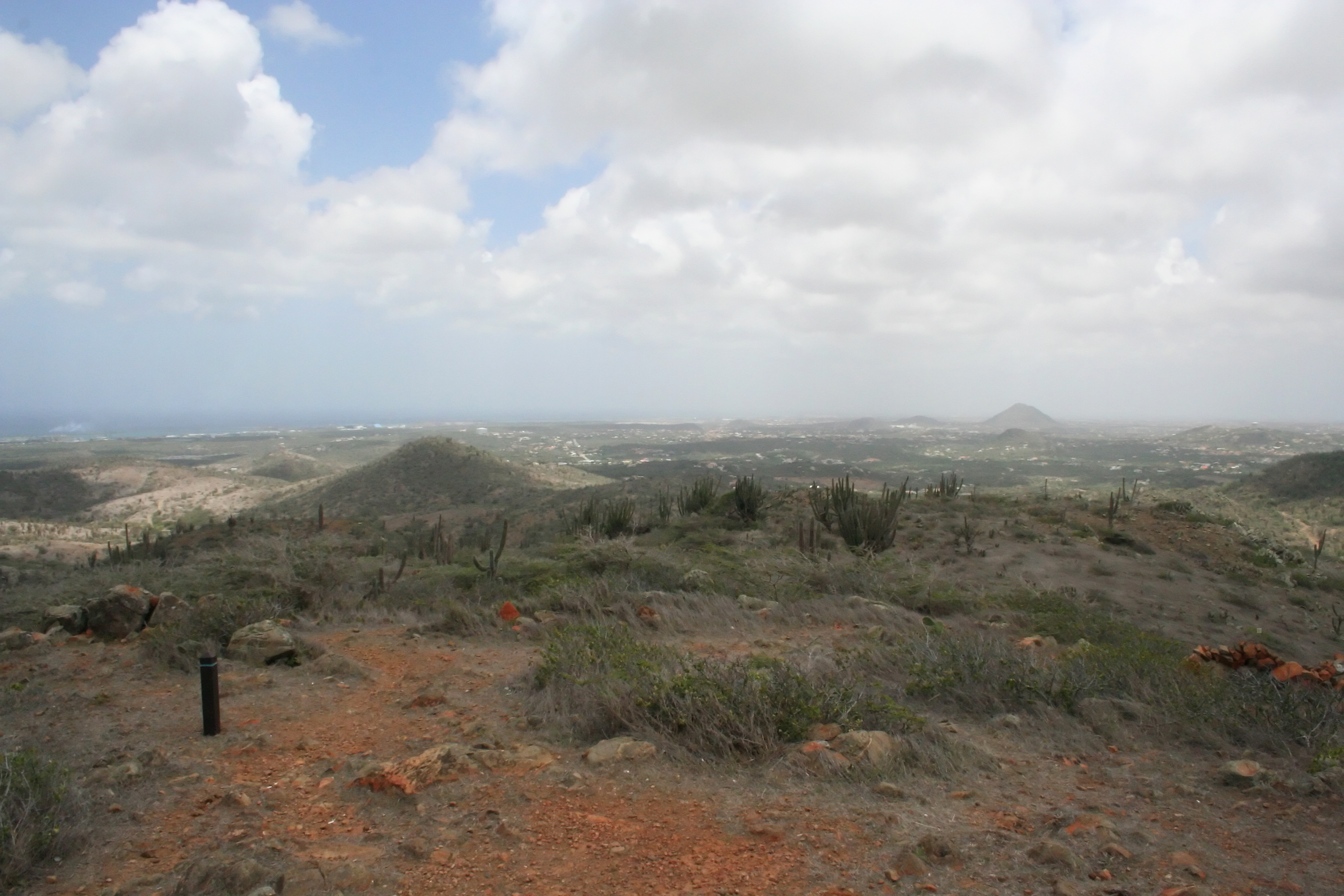
- View from Jamanota

Highest point
- Elevation: 188 m (617 ft)
- Prominence: 188 m (617 ft)
- Listing: Country high point
- Coordinates: 12°29′14″N 69°56′25″W

Naming
- Language of name: Arawak

Geography
- Jamanota location
- Location: Arikok National Park
- Country: Aruba

Geology
- Mountain type: hill
- Rock type(s): Basalt and Diabase (Dolerite)

Climbing
- Access: Jamanota trail

Jamanota is a hill situated within Aruba's Arikok National Park, reaching a height of 188 metres (617 ft) and holding the distinction of being the highest point on the island. Jamanota is a word from the Arawak language and can be explained somewhat as follows: JA or YA is spirit; MA is great or great spirit; NO is a suffix denoting a plural; TA is source. So about, Source of Great Spirits.

This region is known for its rugged and dry landscape, as well as its diverse wildlife, such as the Aruba Parakeet, Aruba Island Rattlesnake, and freely-roaming goats that graze upon the undulating hills of the region. At Jamanota's summit, one can experience a panoramic view that encompasses Frenchman's Pass along the southern coastline, which holds historical significance as indigenous people once defended the island against the French invaders.

== Geology ==
Aruba features three distinct landscapes, each characterized by unique geological formations. In the northwestern part of the island one can find the flat composite batholith landscapes, which includes notable features such as Hooiberg, a conical hill, and quartz-diorite formations like the Ayo and Casibari rock formations).

Moving towards the northeastern region, the oldest formation on the island is known as the Aruba Lava Formation (ALF). This area is characterized by a landscape of undulating hills that encompasses landmarks such as Jamanota and Arikok. Arikok hill has an elevation of 185 metres (607 ft) high. These landscapes are surrounded by a third type of terrain, the limestone formation, which consists of a flat terrace.

These hills are situated in the diabasic portion and are composed of a distinct type of rock called Diabase-Schist-Tuff, as noted in earlier geological research. However, more recent studies have reclassified as the ALF. Description for both classification are presented.

=== Diabase-Schist-Tuff ===
Diabase (also called dolerite) is a fine-grained, intrusive igneous rock that is dark gray to black in color. It resembles basalt and gabbro, but has a different grain size determined by its cooling rate. Basalt cools rapidly and produces tiny crystals that are difficult to see with the naked eye. Diabase cools slower through shallow intrusions, such as sills, dikes, lopoliths or laccoliths. This allows individual crystals to grow up to 2 mm (0.079 in) in size. Gabbro, found at Bushiribana, cools the slowest below the Earth's surface, resulting in crystals over 1 cm (0.39 in) across or even larger. An example of Diabase being used in construction are the "bluestone" pillars at Stonehenge.

On the other hand, Schist is a type of rock that forms when sedimentary rocks, like mud or sediment, are squeezed and heated. This process is known as metamorphism, which results in a metamorphic crystalline rock. The squeezing pressure causes the minerals in the rock to align in layers, creating visible pattern, a property known as foliation.

Lastly, Tuff forms from solidification of materials ejected during explosive volcanic eruption, such as rock, ash, and magma. The thickness and particle size of tuff deposits can vary depending on how far away the eruption site it is. Tuff deposits closer to the site tend to be thicker and have larger particles. When compacted and cemented into a rock, the resulting material is called "tuff".

Basic types of intrusions: 1. Laccolith, 2. Small dike, 3. Batholith, 4. Dike, 5. Sill, 6. Volcanic pipe, 7. Lopolith

=== Aruba Lava Formation ===
The Aruba Lava Formation (ALF) has a thickness of 3 km (1.9 mi) and covers an area of approximately 20 km^{2} (7.7 sq mi). It is primarily composed of basalt (41%) and dolerite (24%), volcaniclastic conglomerate (a type of rock made up of fragments of volcanic rock), sandstone (this is a type of rock made up of sand-sized grains that have been compacted and cemented together), tuff, pelagic chert (a sedimentary rock that forms from remains of microscopic organisms called plankton that lived in the open ocean), cherty limestone (made up of calcium carbonate, the same substance found in seashells, and chert, a hard, dense, sedimentary rock).

The basalts present as both pillow lavas and sheet flows. Pillow lavas are formed when lava enters the water and cools quickly, creating a rounded shape. Sheet flows are formed when lava spreads out on land and hardens into a flat, sheet-like shape. The dolerite sills occur at various levels at a thickness not exceeding 300 metres (980 feet).

== Flora and fauna ==
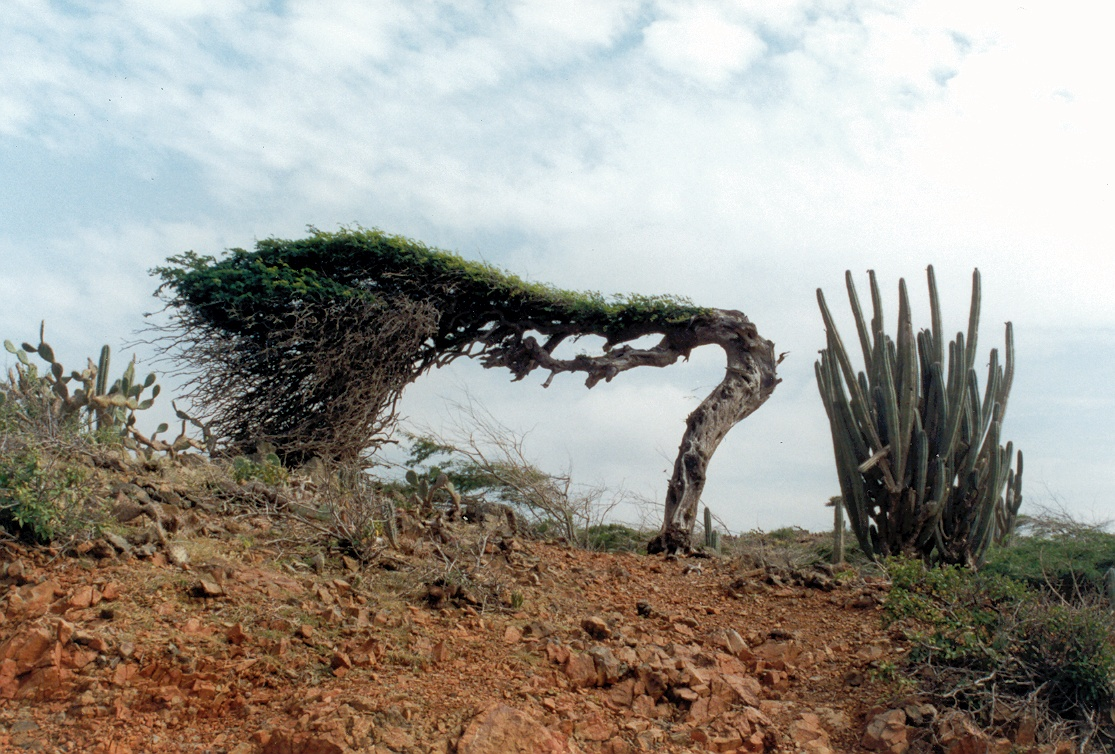
Watapana in Aruba.

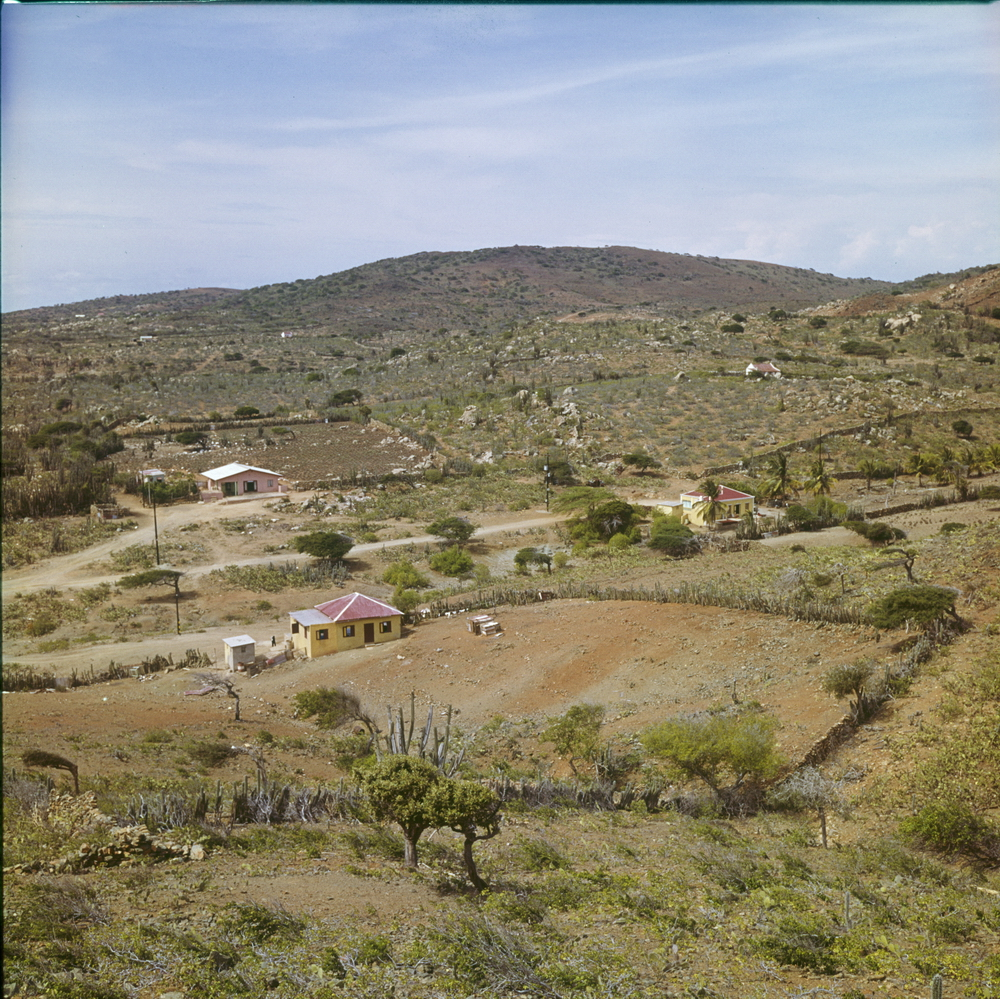
View of the landscape, seen from Jamanota (1964).

=== Watapana ===
The Watapana (Caesalpinia coriaria (Jacq.) Wild.) tree, also known as Dividivi, is recognizable from a considerable distance by its "windform". The tree occurs less frequent on the island of Aruba than on Curaçao and Bonaire. Although Watapana and Dividivi are used synonymously, Dividivi actually refers to the fruit/pods of the Watapana tree. Growing and cultivating Watapanas was a means of living provided many with seasonal work. There were two harvest-period are January and June–July. In years with little rain, the January-crop were good, but sometimes it was spoiled by rainy weather. Women and children went out with sticks, baskets, or bags to beat the pods of the trees and gather them. They handed them to the owners, who would pay them twenty-five Dutch cents for approximately every 20 kg (44 lb). The principle market for these pods was Hamburg. Dividivi was used at tanneries on the Elbe river for the preparation of leather, which was then manufactured into the greased leather boots of East-European farmers. Aruba never shipped directly; everything was sent via Curaçao. Dividivi was in high demand as tannin, and in some places, it could be sold for sixty to eighty Dutch guilders a ton. Half-ripe pods, when pounded fine and boiled, yielded a pap that was used as medicine to open sores of animals. One of the best years was 1911, when Aruba exported 303.000 kg (668.001 lb). In earlier times, the word Watapaana (see spelling 1914) also meant a flogging, as thin branches were used to punish slaves.

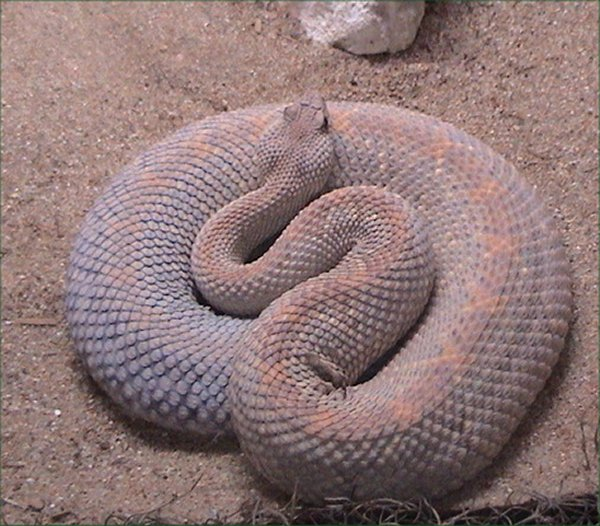
Pale gray to bluish gray in color (Crotalus unicolor).

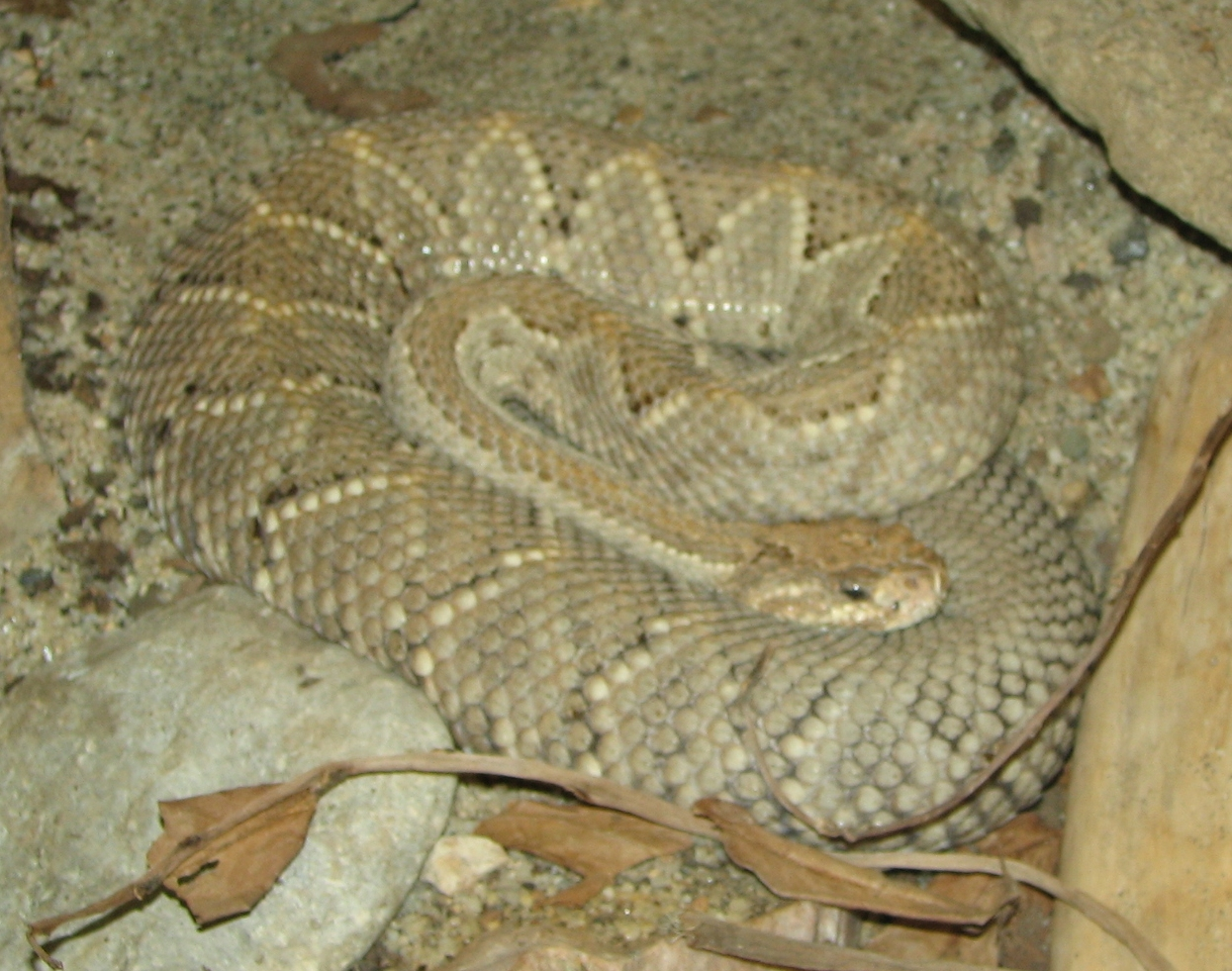
Pale grayish-brown in color (Crotalus unicolor).

=== Aruba Island rattlesnake ===
Papiamento: Cascabel | Dutch: Aruba ratelslang

The Aruba island rattlesnake (Crotalus unicolor) appears as uniformly colored snakes, with hardly little or no pattern. Aruba Island rattlesnake typically occur un two basic color phases. One, the ground color can pale gray to bluish gray. In the other, it can be brown or pale grayish-brown. In addition to the uniform ground color of most specimens, there is frequently a varying amount of darker gray pigment, occurring as a fine stippling or speckling. Often times, the lower sides of the body are pinkish or pinkish orange color. The average length of the Aruba Island rattlesnake ranges between 60–80 cm (24–31 in) in total length. It is a venomous species found in the sparsely populated areas of Arikok National Park. Aruba rattlesnakes are found in a range of elevations, from sea level 2 m (6.6 ft) up to the top of Jamanota, but they are most commonly found in the diabase hills and terraced limestone plateau. In contrast, there are no historical records or local reports suggesting that rattlesnakes have occupied the western side of the island. Much of this area is densely populated and has been subjected to human disturbance. The habitat of the rattlesnake can be categorized as thorn scrub and desert. The rattlesnake is endemic to the island and feeds on small rodents, birds, and lizards. The Aruba rattlesnake are active in the early morning and late afternoon but are nocturnal during the warmer months.

=== White-tailed Hawk and Crested Caracara ===
Papiamento: Falki, Partawela, Gabilan di seru | Dutch: Witstaartbuizerd

One notable examples is the rare, White-tailed Hawk (Geranoaetus albicaudatus), which is believed to have nested exclusively in the Jamanota area. While there have been sightings that have not been verified of this species in 1988 and 1997, its current presence on the island has not been confirmed. The White-tailed Hawk's distinctive call has been described as a 'penetrating "kee-weet, kee-weet".' However, these hawks are sometimes mistaken for other commonly found birds, such as the Crested Caracara (Caracara plancus) and Osprey (Pandion haliaetus). The Crested Caracara, also known as the Warawara or Kuifcaracara in Papiamento and Dutch, respectively. The Warawara is the best-known falcon on the island and is the "garbageman" of the mondi (wilderness in Papiamento). They prefer to make their nests in the tall column cacti during the breeding season.

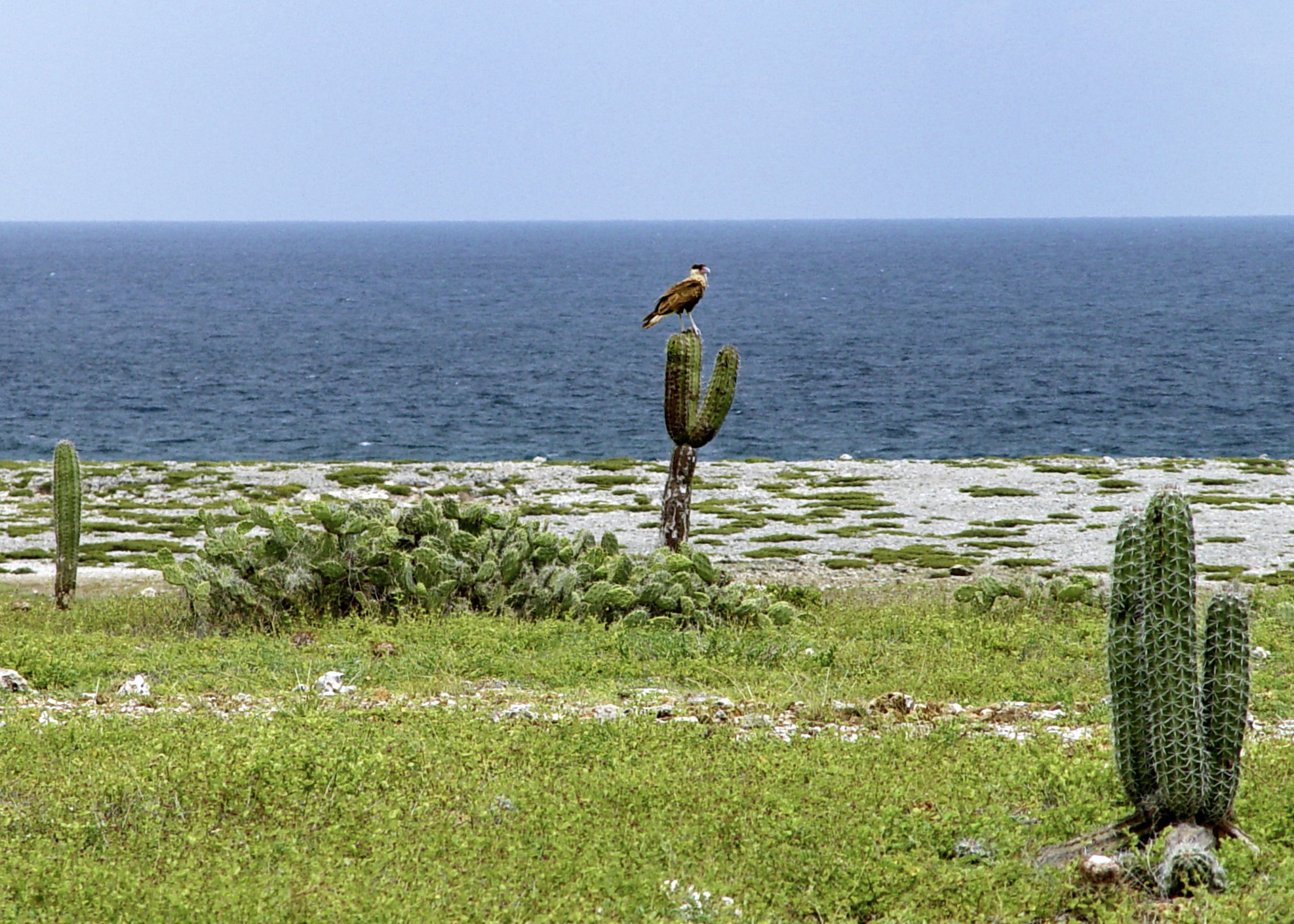
Crested Caracara (English). Warawara (Papiamento). Kuifcaracara (Dutch).

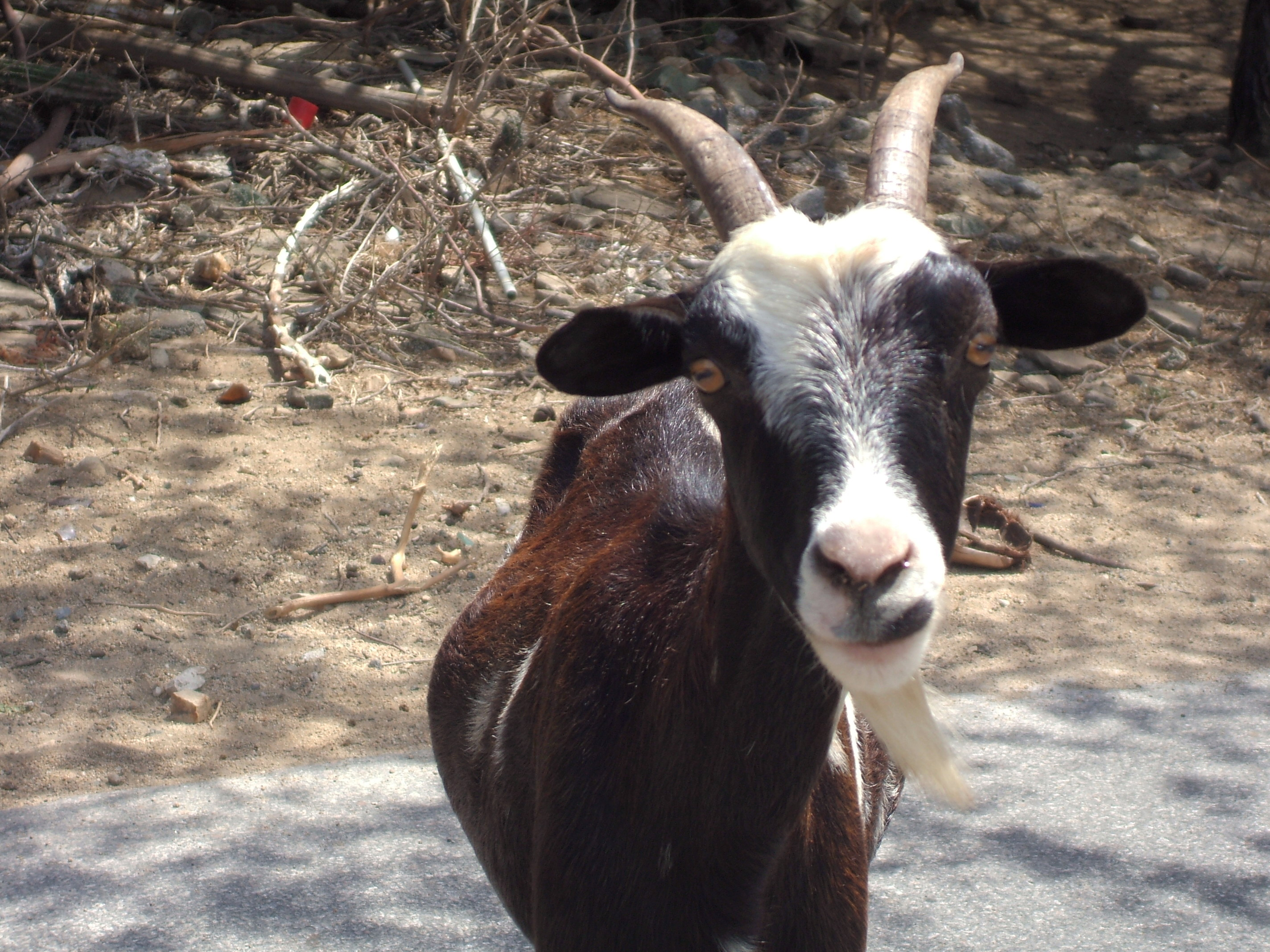
Feral goat.

=== Goat ===
Papiamento: Cabrito | Dutch: geit

In the 16th century, Spaniards transported herding animals, including goats, to Aruba after declaring the ABC islands useless supposedly for the lack of precious resources. Aruba became a kind of Spanish rancho with herds roaming free. By 1661, the number of goats increased to such an extent that the West India Company (WIC) referred to Aruba (and Bonaire) as goat-islands. The Aruban rancho system was hardly suitable for sheep breeding; as goat can be left to take care of themselves and endure the arid environment. Goats (and donkeys) remain alive and even propagate, while cattle perish of starvation.

In Catalonia and Galicia, Spaniards preferred goat's milk over cow's milk, and goats were practically unknown by the Dutch, who would never put goat's milk above cow's milk. This is most likely the reason for the introduction of goats during the Spanish colonization. Aruba's importance lay in its meat supply to Curaçao; Indian inhabitants reared cattle and goats for meat. Around 1780, a land-tax was introduced to the island, which protected it against annexation and induced an influx of Europeans (all old Aruban families can be traced back to this period) through Curaçao and Bonaire. Little plantation began to spring up everywhere on Aruba, mainly for raising sheep and goats. After 1910, the number of goats has dwindled quickly as owners sold their animals due to failed crops, falling from 7,732 to 3,520 goats in a four-year time period.

As of 2015, there were an estimated 43 goats per square kilometer (16 goats per square mile), which equates to approximately 1465 goats in the Arikok National Park. While goats are non-selective animals, they do prefer Hubada/Twisted acacia (Acacia tortuosa), Tuna/Prickly pear (Opuntia caracassana Salm-Dyck), or Cadushi/Tall candelabra cactus (Stenocereus Griseus), and any other vegetation would be sensitive for trampling by goats. The more goats graze in an area, the more monotonous the vegetation becomes. Hubada is a widespread vegetation species in the park and goats have spread their seeds. However, goats destroy the habitat and food supply of other animals by grazing on vegetation that is sensitive to trampling. For instance, goats gnaw on Cadushi cacti, which kills the plant. The flower of this cactus is an important source of food for bats and birds. Additionally, goats trample or injure the Aruban Island rattlesnake. Although the rattlesnake warns of danger by using its rattle, it does not flee when threatened by goats, which do not perceive the warning.

== See also ==
- List of birds of Aruba
- Arikok National Park
- Hooiberg
