= Canashito =

Prehistoric site in Santa Cruz, Aruba

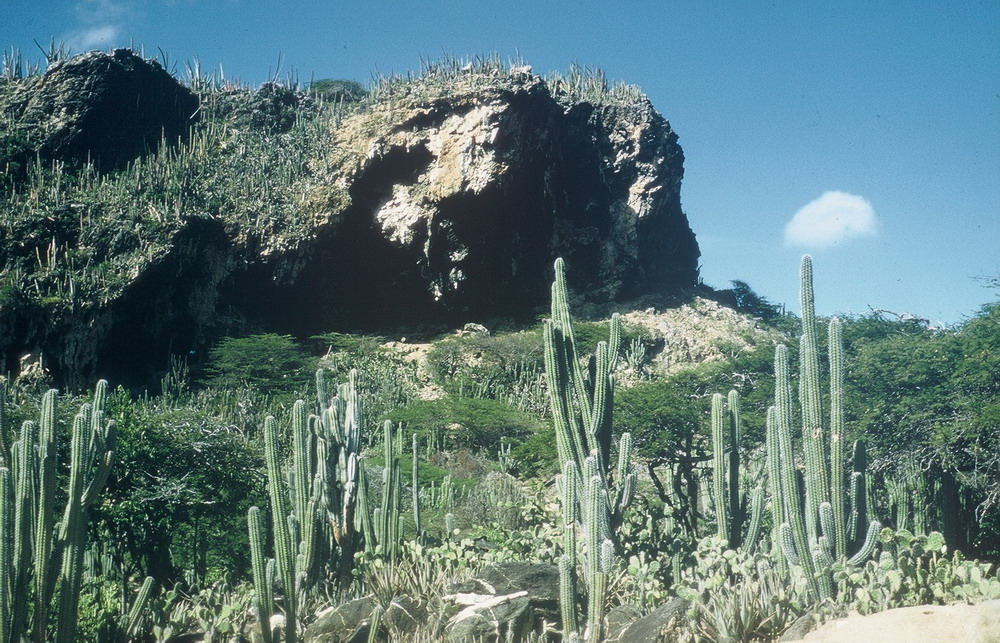
- Interactive map of Canashito
- Location: Santa Cruz, Aruba
- Coordinates: 12°30′18.8″N 69°59′35.6″W
- Elevation: 63.2 m (207 ft)

Canashito, also known as Canachito, Cornachiti or Carachito, is located inland on a limestone outcrop, near Hooiberg, in Santa Cruz, Aruba, measuring 63.2 metres (207 ft) in elevation above sea level. This toponym Canashito is thought to have possible Amerindian origin. This limestone outcrop is of significance as a notable Archaic period site.

== History ==
=== State plantation ===
Around 1800, Canashito emerged as a small plantation following the migration of colonists from Curaçao, which began in 1754. In 1836, the new administrator, R.F. van Raders believed that cultivating crops would have a positive influence on maritime traffic and trade. Van Raders initiated model plantations in the Leeward islands, hoping that others would follow suit, and Aruba was included in these experiments. Cochineal and aloe were cultivated at this small plantation, including the Socotoro plantation in Oranjestad at that time, but faced challenges marked by successive crop failures attributed to drought. In 1848, under the administration of I.J.M. Elsevier Jr., the experiment was resumed, and these plantations were revitalized to provide employment for the impoverished colonists. This decision coincided with the realization that the conclusion of slavery had also commenced in Dutch colonies. The results, however, were once again disappointing, leading to the discontinuation in 1851.

=== Parish ===
In 1860, pastor Nicolaas A. Kuiperi established a Protestant church in Canashito. The villagers from Savaneta relied on Catholic pastoral care from Santa Cruz. Between 1858 and 1871, Kuiperi attempted to halt the advance of the Catholic mission in the "districts". As recorded in the baptismal records of the Protestant Community, Kuiperi baptized children whose parents who belonged to the Savanetero's. On 17 February 1879, during the conflict between Catholics and Protestants, the church at Canashito was set on fire. Ten years later, the church fell into disrepair, and the decision to not rebuild the church was based on the fact that the Protestant Community didn't own the property it was built on. Resulting, in the construction of the Protestant church in Piedra Plat in 1899. Following Kuiperi's departure, Savaneta remained deprived of Protestant care, and gradually, most Protestant families converted to Catholicism.

On the property, remnants of the church's foundations can still be found, 30 metres (98 ft) away, there is a cemetery. Not much remains of the twelve cellars; it has transformed more into an untamed wilderness. The interior walls of the house at Canashito 18 are a section of the wall of the Protestant church.

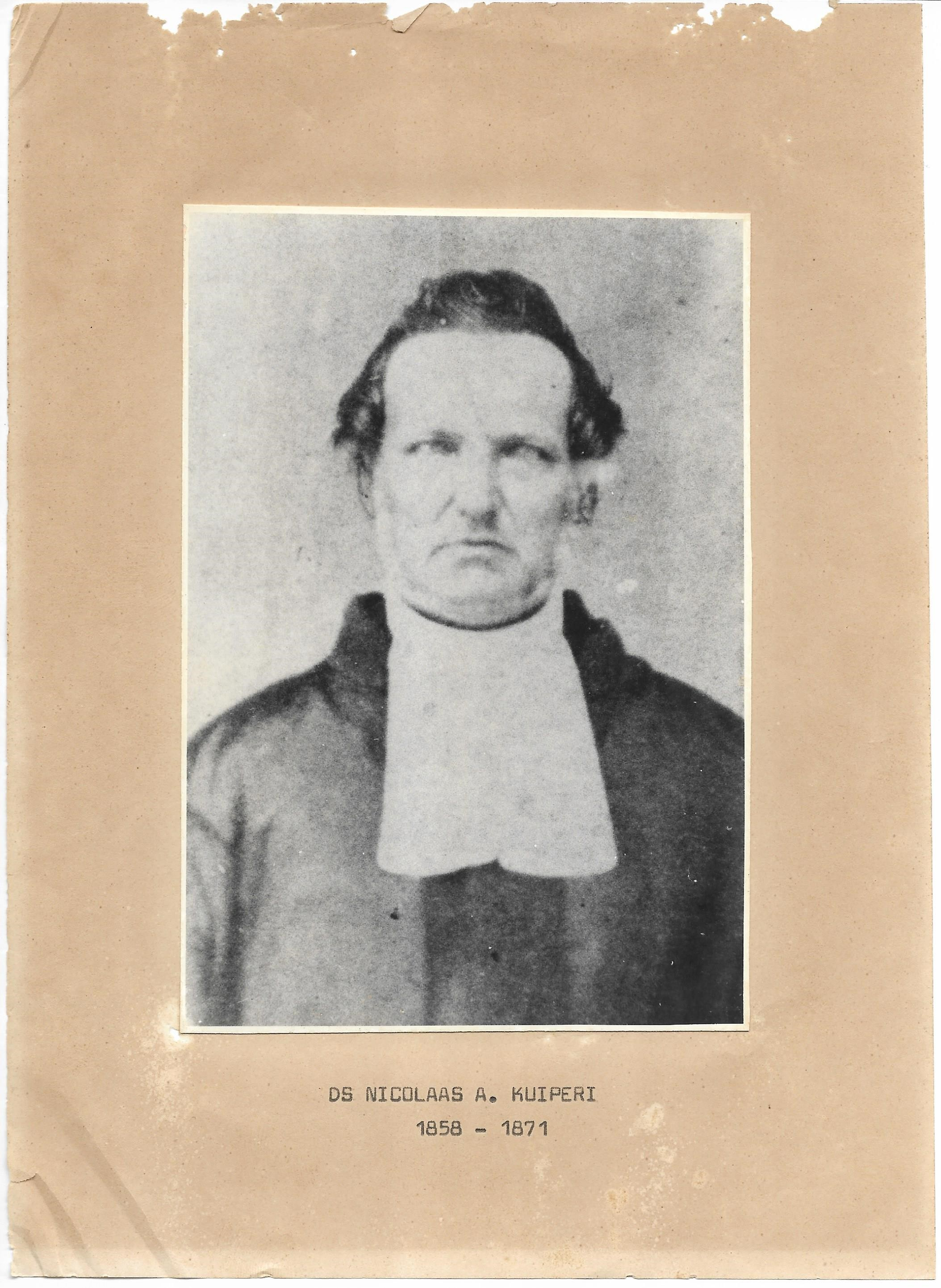
Pastor Nicolaas A. Kuiperi (1858–1871)

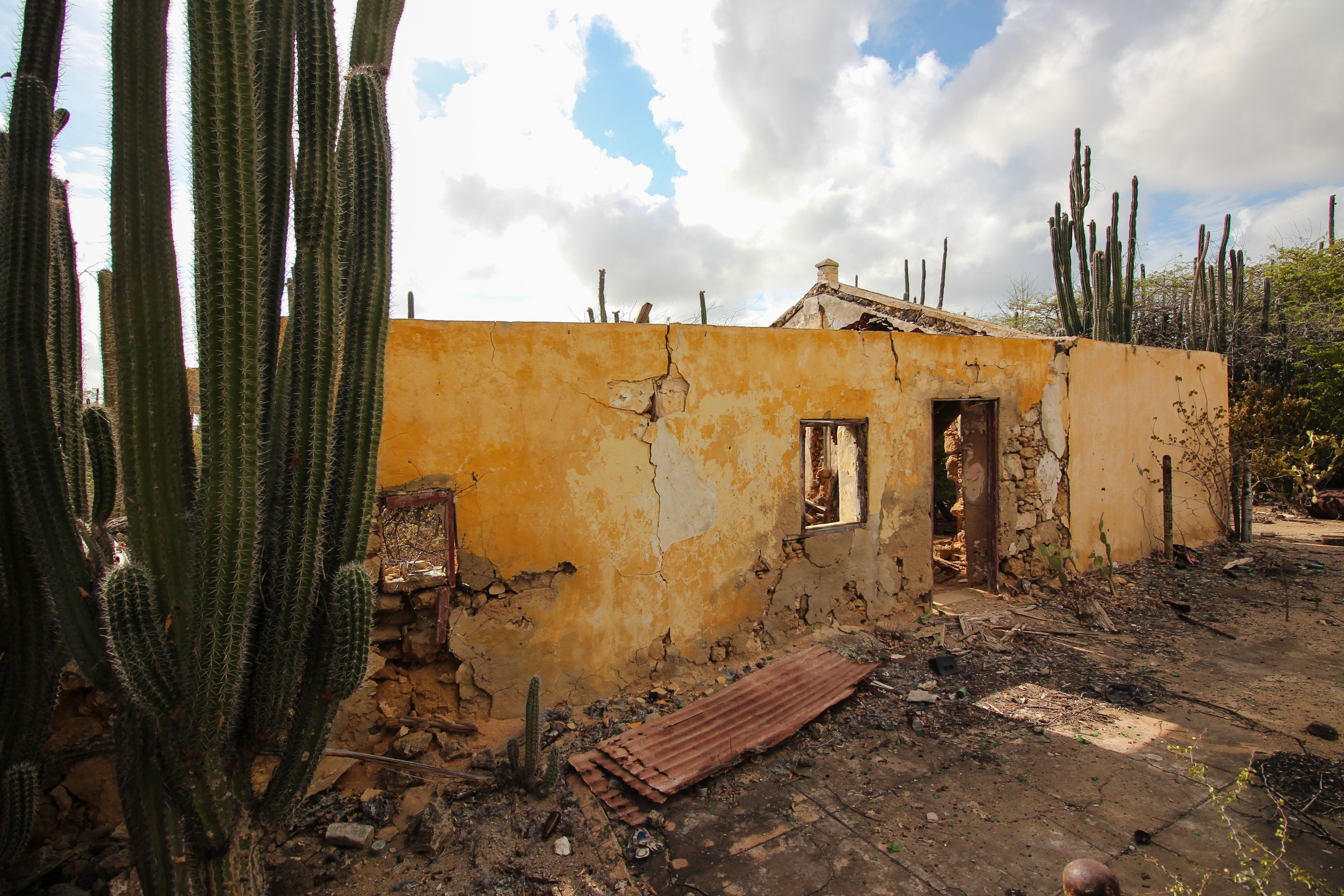
Ruin at Canashito 18

== Bioarchaeology ==
On the slope leading to the abri entrance, archeologists uncovered remnants of shell food, indicating past human activity in the area. Additionally, under the abri, five human burials were discovered. In terms of human variability, one of the individuals discovered was not native to Aruba. This person had followed a distinctly different diet compared to the other individuals, all of whom were Aruban. This finding suggests that migration and cultural exchange were integral components of cultural practices among these archaic Indians from an early period. Starch grain analyses from Archaic Age sites in Aruba, including Malmok, indicated the presence of maize, cocoyam, manioc, marunguey, and sweet potato in Aruban samples.

Radiocarbon dating of one of the skeletons yielded a date corresponding to the period of 1960 ±65 BP, or cal. AD 83-394, providing insights into the historical timeline of human activity at the Canashito site. The findings at this archaeological site contribute to the understanding of the cultural and historical significance of the region during the Archaic Age.

== Sources ==
- Alofs, Luc (1997). Savaneta, een vlek of dorp [Savaneta, a hamlet or village].
- Kelly, Harold; Hofman, Corinne L. (2019). "The Archaic Age of Aruba: New evidence on the first migrations to the island". In Hofman, Corinne L.; Antczak, Andrzej T. (eds.). Early Settlers of the Insular Caribbean: Dearchaizing the archaic. Leiden: Sidestone Press. pp. 147–161.
- Mickleburgh, Hayley L.; Laffoon, Jason E. (2018). "Assessing dietary and subsistence transitions on prehistoric Aruba: Preliminary bioarcheological evidence". In Reid, Basil A. (ed.). The Archeology of Caribbean and Circum-Caribbean Farmers 6000 BC-AD 1500. London and New York: Routledge. pp. 288–306. ISBN 9781351169202.
