= Casibari =

Settlement in Aruba

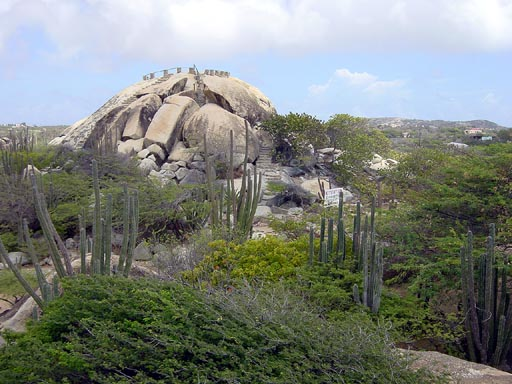
- Casibari rock formation

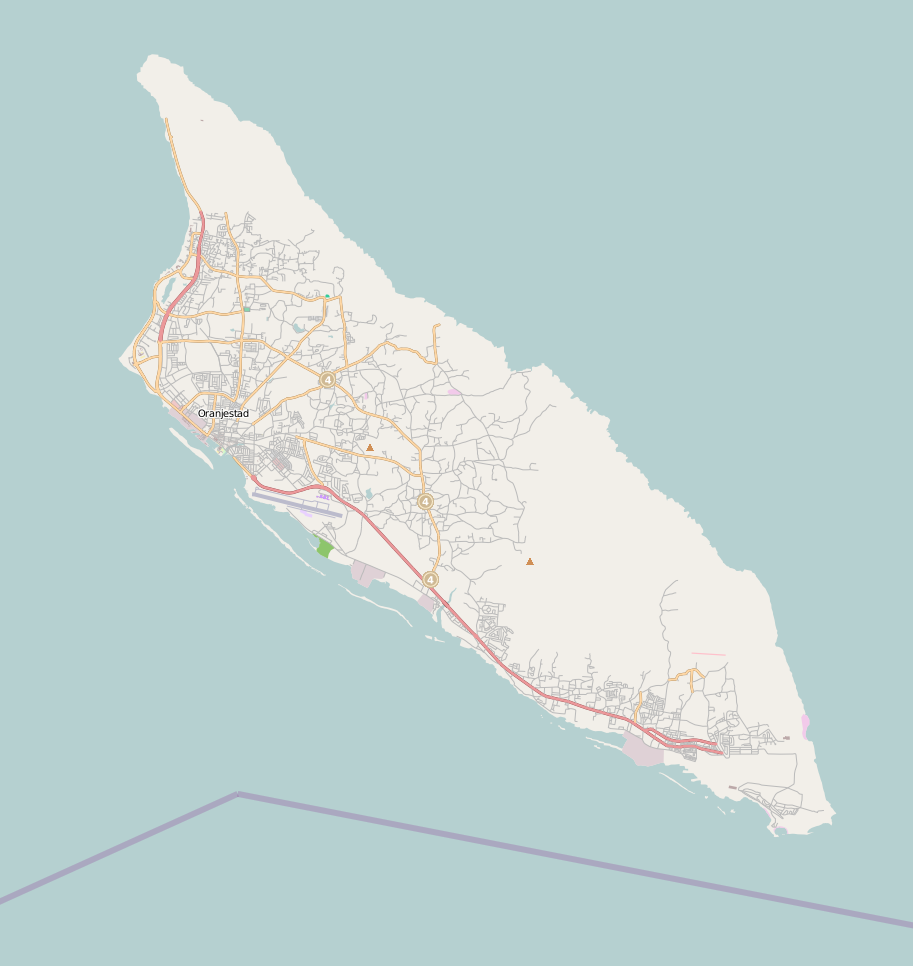
- Location of Casibari in Paradera
- Country: Aruba
- Town: Paradera

Casibari is a settlement of Paradera, north of Hooiberg, in Aruba. Evidence of prehistoric rock drawings is still visible at the site. "Casibari" is an Indian name of Arawak (possibly Taíno) origin and can be explained as follows: CA as a prefix means "where there are"; SIBA (or CIBA) means "stone"; and RI as a suffix means "good"; the translation is "where there are good stones". The name can also be explained as follows: CASIBA (or CACIBA) as "hollow" or "cavern", with RI as "good", leads to the meaning "good hole /cavern". This toponym also stands for cas di baril, or "house of barrel", the first tin house in Aruba – made from oil barrels.

== Geography ==
=== Landforms ===
Aruba was mainly shaped by plate collisions that led to the creation of igneous rocks and their subsequent exposure. However, despite this volcanic origin, a significant portion of the surface features in this area consists of sedimentary landforms. This transformation occurred during the Upper Eocene epoch when sedimentary processes, like the formation of reef terraces, took place over the existing volcanic rocks. Today, you can still observe remnants of these volcanic rocks on the surface, which are visible in formations such as the Ayo and Casibari rock formations, and Hooiberg.
