= Pieter Schouten =

Dutch corsair and privateer

- Born: fl. 1622; Vlissingen, Netherlands
- Died: 1625
- Piratical career
- Type: Corsair
- Allegiance: Netherlands
- Years active: 1620s
- Rank: Admiral
- Base of operations: Caribbean
- Battles: Eighty Years' War

Pieter Schouten (fl. 1622-1625) was a 17th-century Dutch corsair and privateer. He was one of the first Dutchmen to explore to the Caribbean and, while employed by the Dutch West Indies Company, was involved in extensive reconnaissance to establish Dutch bases in the West Indies.

== Biography ==
Born in Vlissingen, Pieter Schouten found employment in the Dutch West Indies Company as would other former corsairs during this period. In early 1624, he was assigned three ships with which to chart the Caribbean as well as provide valuable reconnaissance on possibility of establishing Dutch bases in the region. Leaving port on January 26, his small squadron included the 24-gun Hoop under Captain Willem Jacobszoon, the 14-gun Eendracht under Captain Hillebrandt Janszoon and the 8-gun yacht Trouwe commanded by Captain Hendrik Worst.

After arriving in Barbados in mid-March or May, he visited several islands and charted the coasts of Venezuela, Haiti, Jamaica and Cuba. He also briefly visited the Little Caymans to hunt turtles, becoming one of the earliest Europeans to land on the islands. His fleet captured several small vessels on the way, although none of his ships were capable of taking the faster and well-armed Spanish galleons. He left Cuba in August and remained in the Caribbean intending to finally head back to the Netherlands the following spring. However, the Eendracht had fallen behind and soon lost contact with Schouten and his flagship. By the time they had reestablished contact, they had encountered two Spanish merchant ships from Honduras. Willem Jacobszoon had managed to capture one of these, the San Juan Bautista under the command of Captain Francisco Hernandez y Moreno, and later used by the crew of the Eendracht when they were forced to abandon their after it ran aground at Tortuga Cays (north of present-day Havana, Cuba). Schouten and his men eventually arrived back in Vlissingen on September 13, 1624. Among the cargo brought back on the Spanish prize included 1,600 chests of sugar, 3,000 animal skins, large amounts of sarsaparilla, balm oil and several chests of silver. The wealth from the one ship alone was enough to convince the Dutch of the value of supporting future expeditions against the Spanish in the Caribbean. As a result of his expedition, St. Martin became one of the first Dutch colonies to be established before its destruction by a passing Spanish fleet in 1633.

An account of his three-year voyage was published at Leiden in 1644 by Johannes de Laet, a writer and director of the Dutch West Indies Company, which were included with those of Mathijs Hendriksz and Piet Heyn.
