= Beaches of Aruba =

Location of Aruba

There are more than a dozen beaches of Aruba. Aruba is part of the Kingdom of the Netherlands and an island country in the mid-south of the Caribbean Sea.

== Beaches ==
The beaches of Aruba include the following:

- Andicuri Beach, 12°32′25″N 69°57′15″W
- Arashi Beach, 12°36′34″N 70°03′14″W
- Baby Beach, 12°24′53″N 69°52′51″W
- Bachelor's Beach, 12°25′55″N 69°52′19″W
- Beach at the Blue Residences, 12°33′42″N 70°03′17″W
- Boca Catalina Beach, 12°36′17″N 70°03′06″W
- Boca Grandi Beach, 12°26′25″N 69°52′26″W
- Boca Prins Beach, Arikok National Park, 12°29′57″N 69°54′25″W
- Cura Cabay Beach, 12°26′25″N 69°55′49″W
- Daimari Beach, 12°31′52″N 69°56′25″W
- Divi Beach, 12°32′15″N 70°03′34″W
- Dos Playa Beach, Arikok National Park, 12°30′21″N 69°55′08″W
- Druif Beach, 12°36′20″N 70°01′54″W
- Eagle Beach, 12°32′52″N 70°03′25″W
- Flamingo Beach, Renaissance Island, 12°30′05″N 70°01′46″W
- Grapefield Beach, 12°26′55″N 69°52′37″W
- Hadicurari Beach, 12°35′09″N 70°02′46″W
- Iguana Beach, 12°30′01″N 70°01′42″W
- Malmok Beach, 12°35′53″N 70°02′59″W
- Manchebo Beach, 12°32′25″N 70°03′48″W
- Mangel Halto Beach, 12°27′54″N 69°58′10″W
- Palm Beach, 12°34′31″N 70°02′45″W
- De Palm Island, 12°28′20″N 69°59′10″W
- Rincon Beach, 12°27′17″N 69°52′47″W
- Rodgers Beach, 12°25′02″N 69°53′03″W
- Surfside Beach, 12°30′23″N 70°01′49″W
- Wariruri Beach, 12°33′33″N 69°59′17″W

== Gallery ==
Beach scenes in Aruba
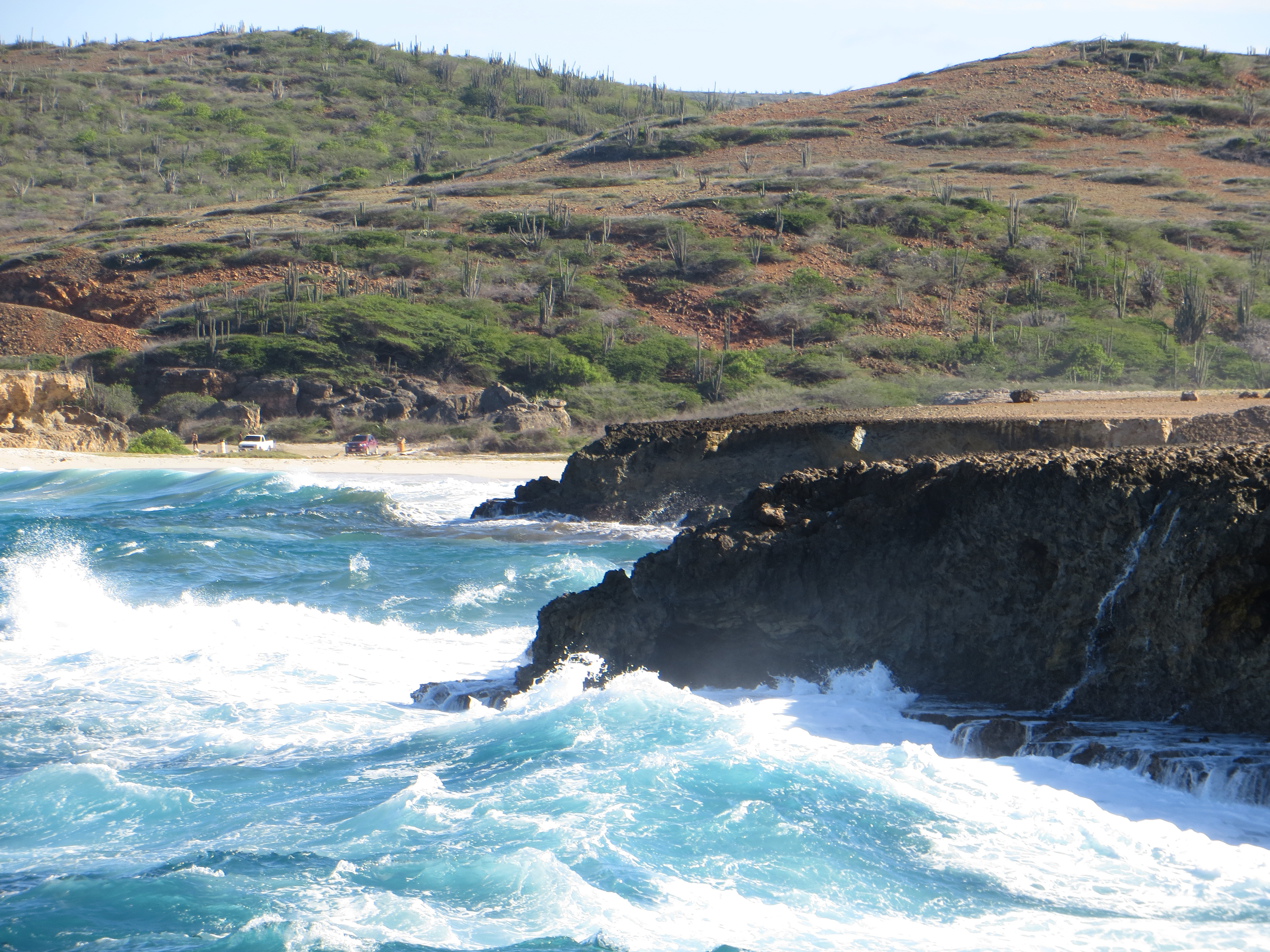
Andicuri beach from natural bridge

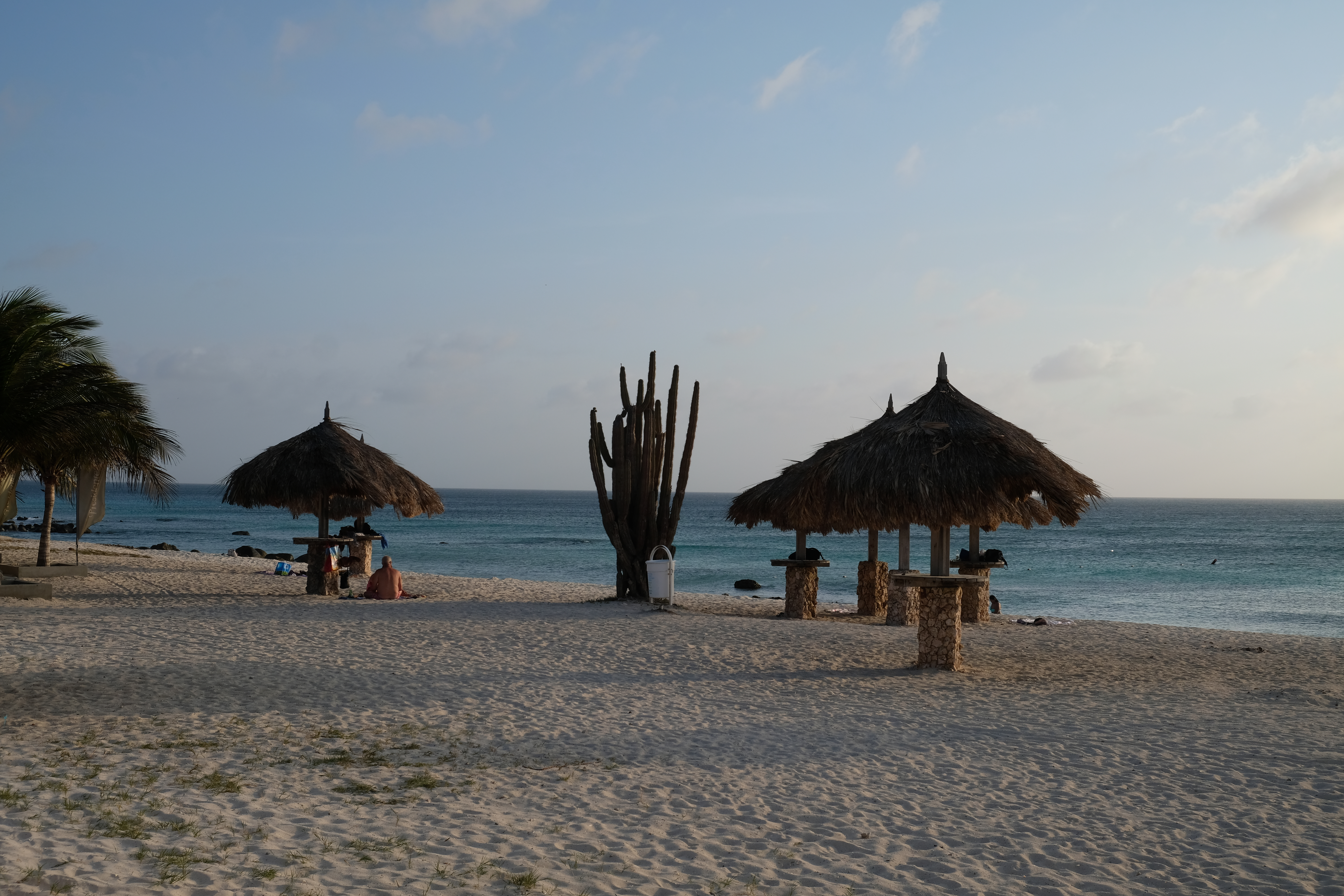
Arashi Beach

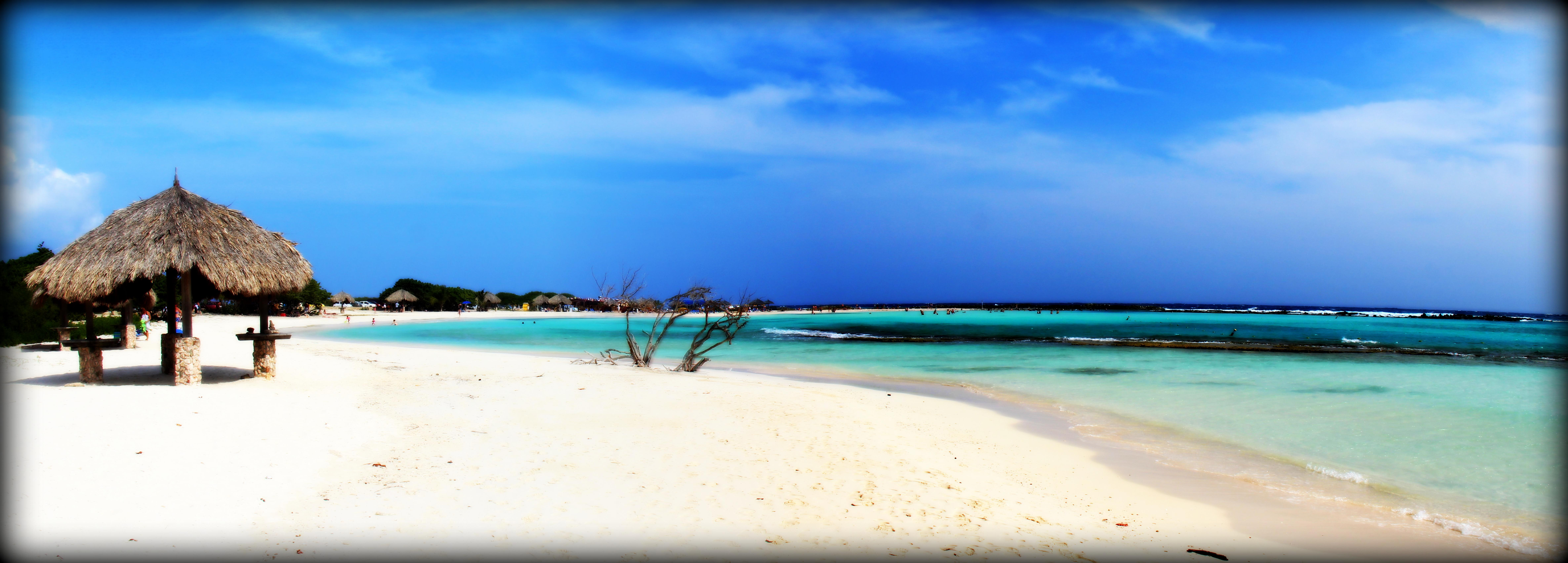
Baby Beach

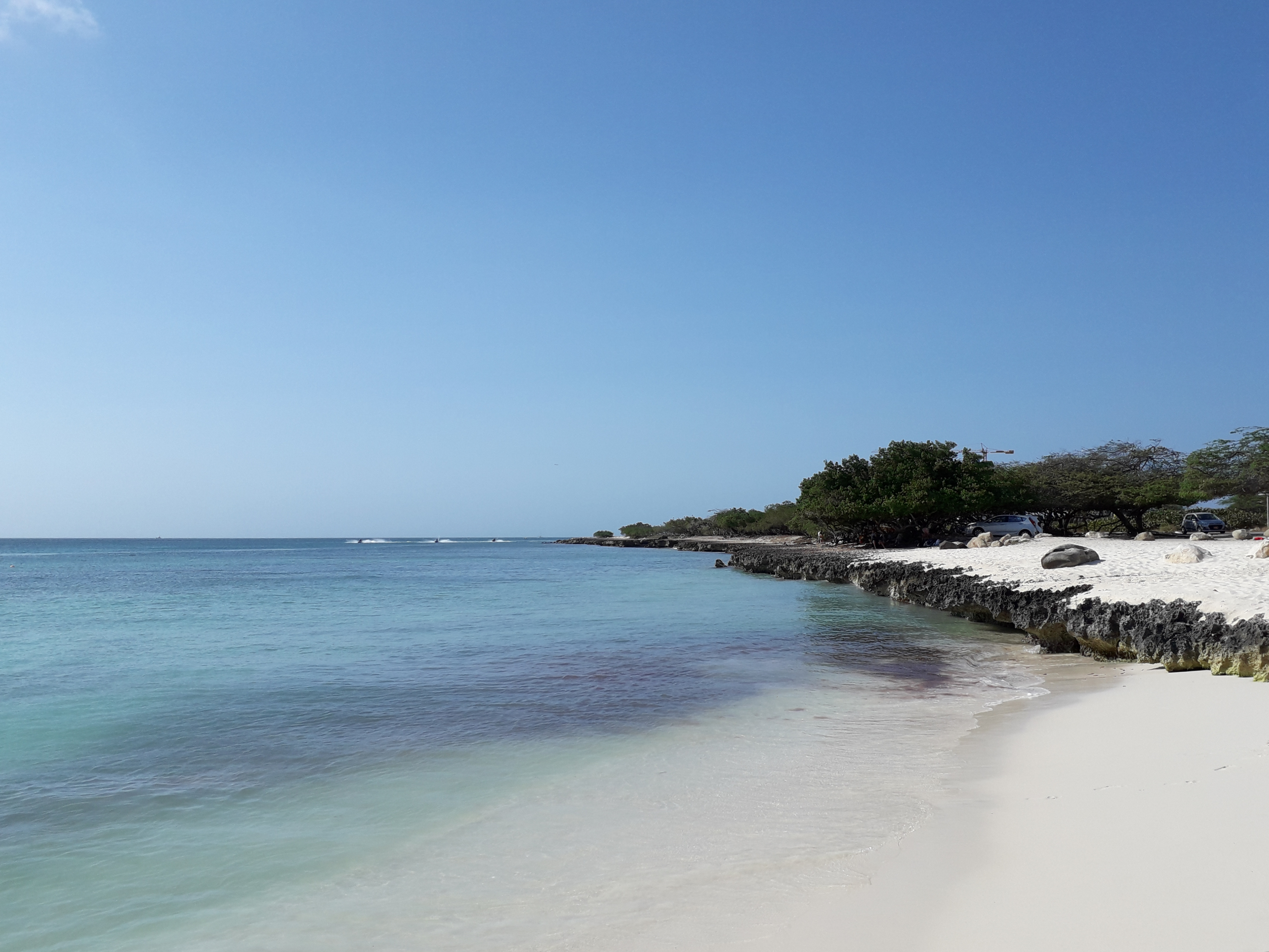
Eagle Beach

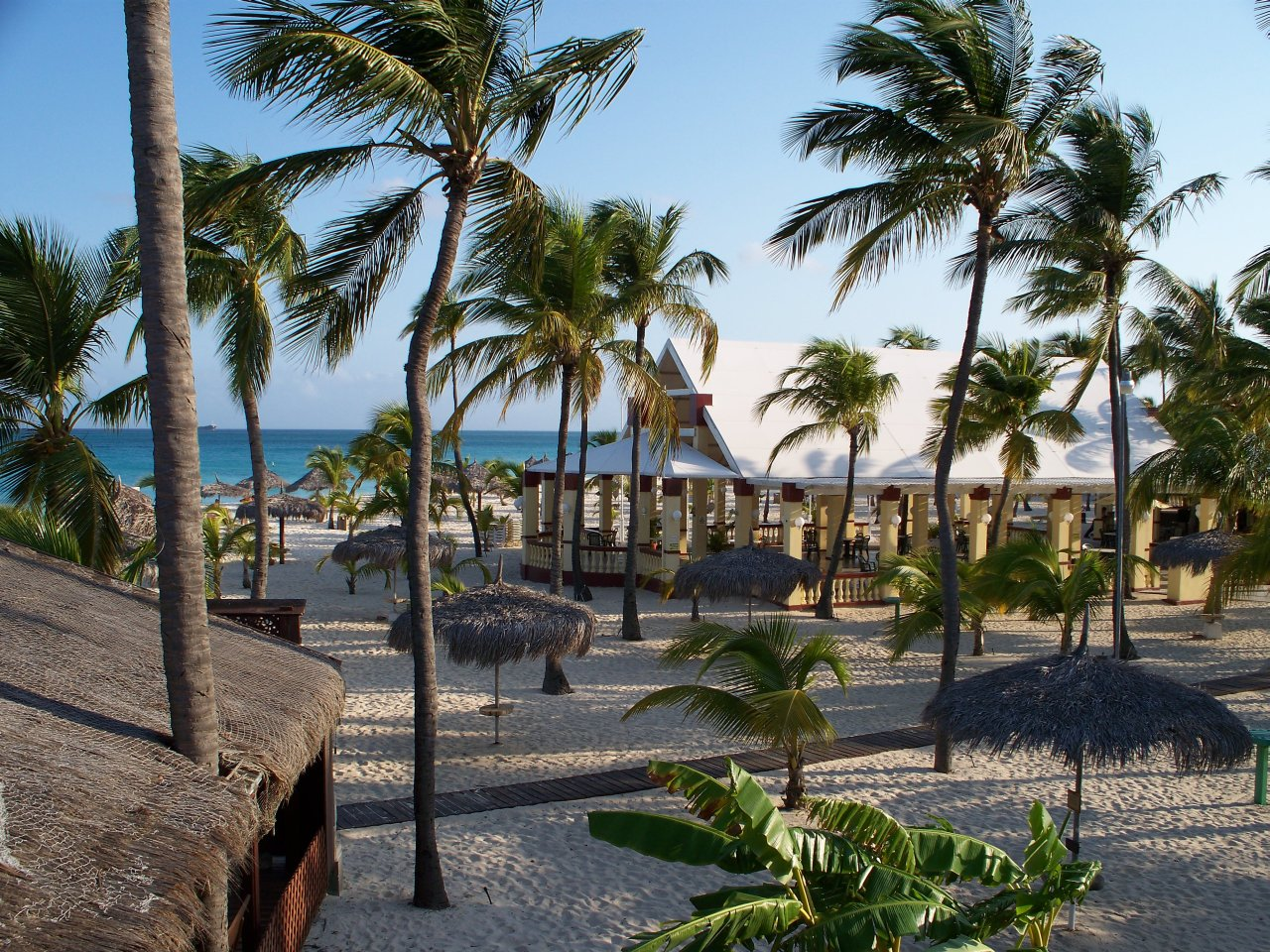
Manchebo Beach

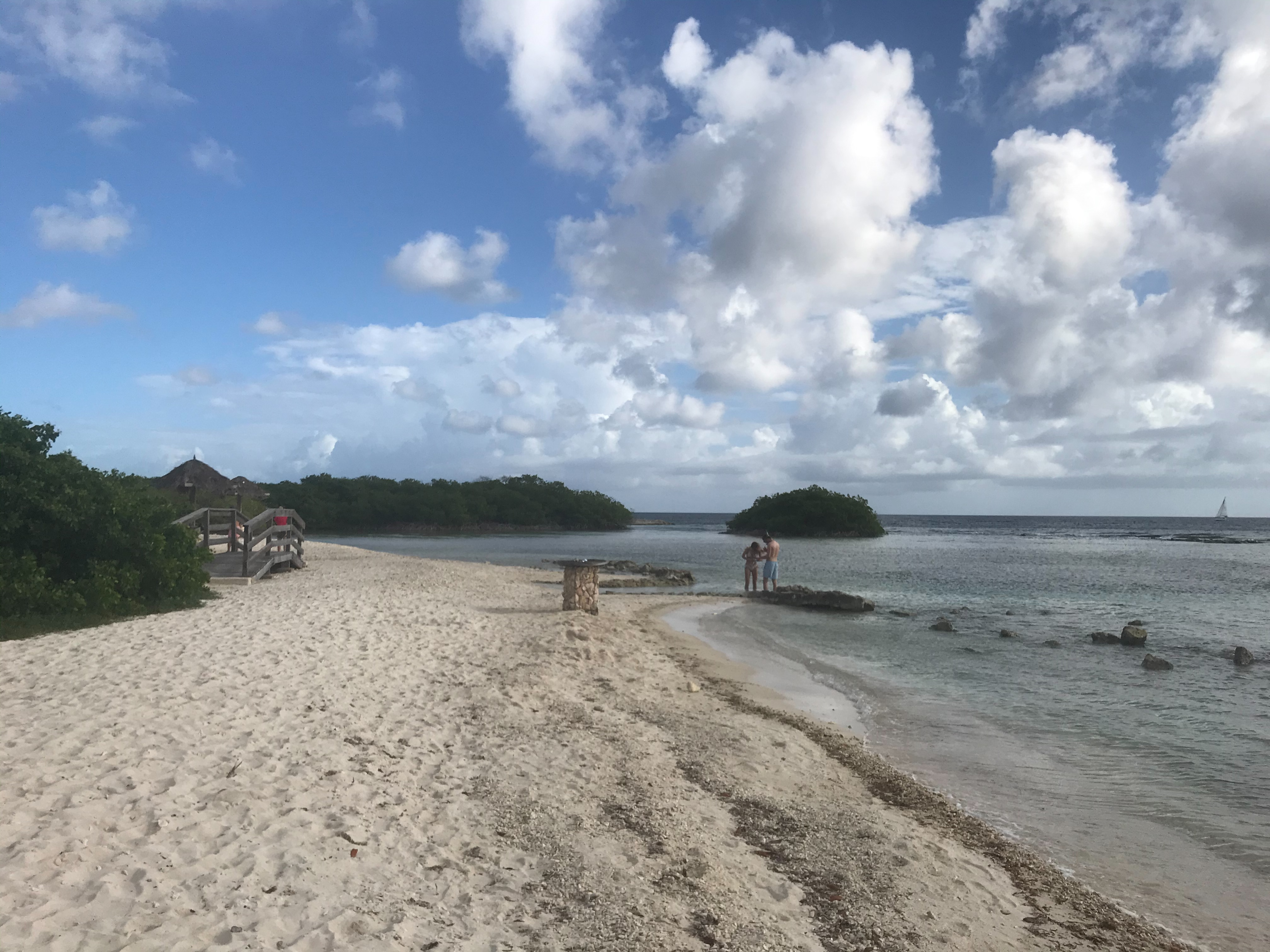
Mangel Halto Beach

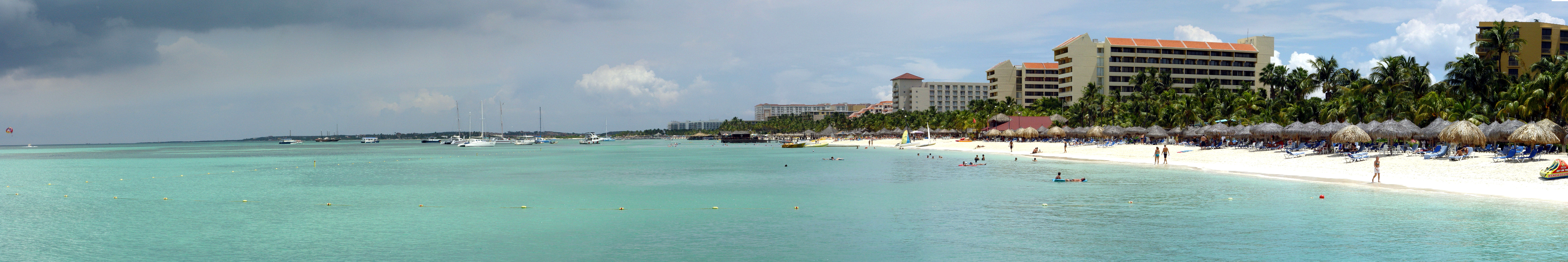
Palm Beach

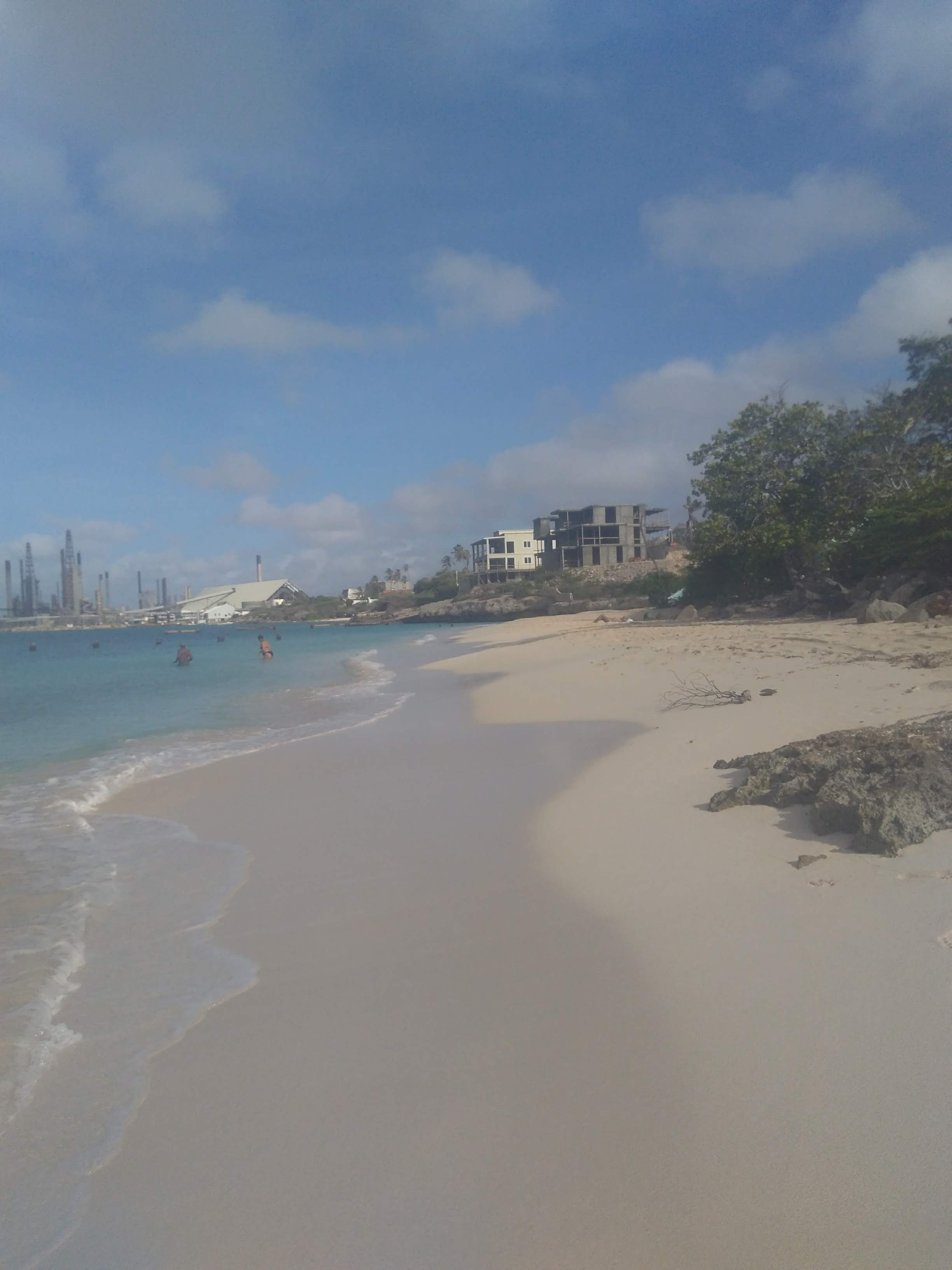
Rodgers Beach

== See also ==
- Geography of Aruba
- Islands of Aruba
- Caves of Aruba
