= USS Clamagore =

Submarine of the United States

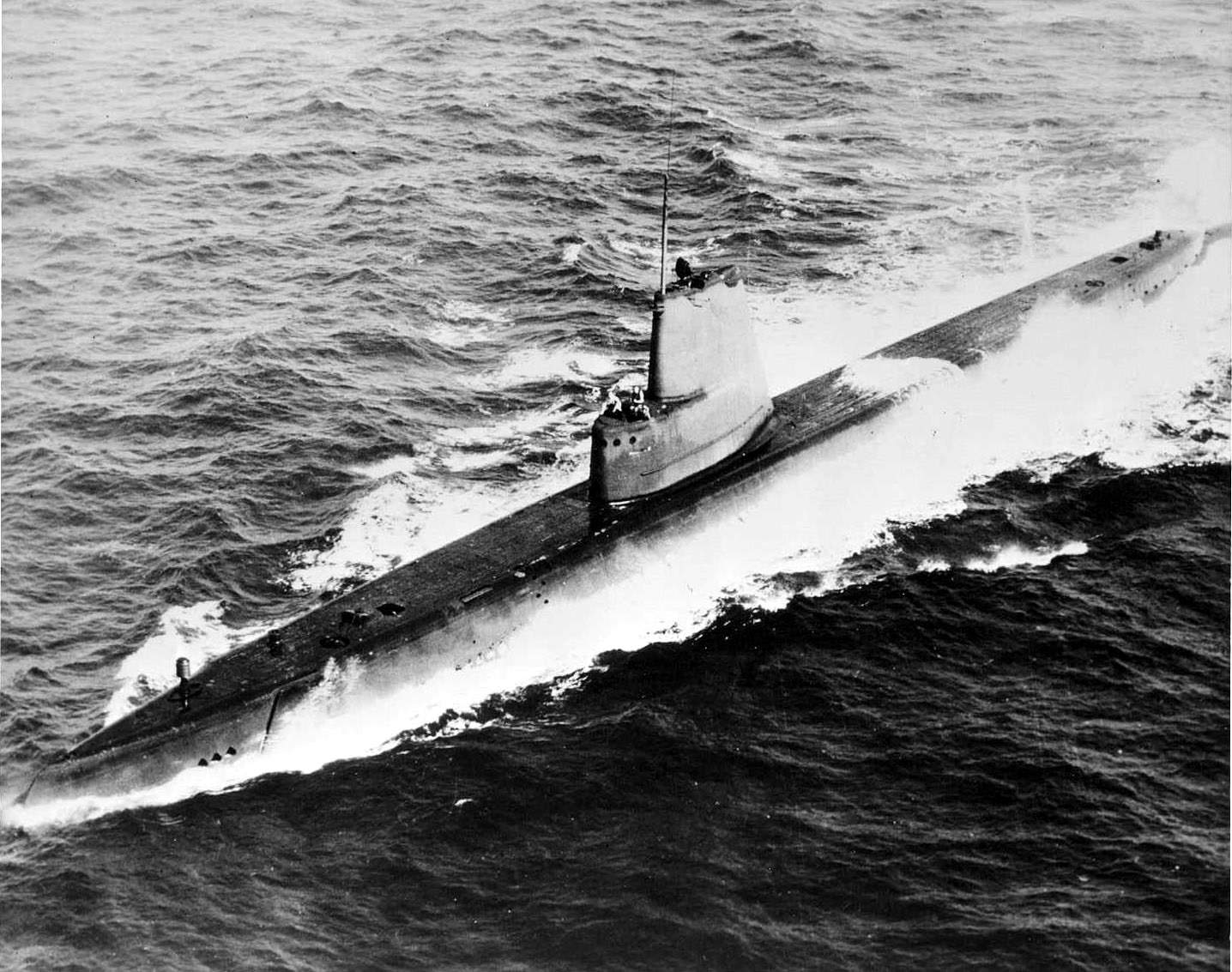
- USS Clamagore (SS-343), some time after her GUPPY conversion

History

United States
- Name: Clamagore
- Namesake: Clamagore
- Builder: Electric Boat Company, Groton, Connecticut
- Laid down: 16 March 1944
- Launched: 25 February 1945
- Sponsored by: Miss M. J. Jacobs
- Commissioned: 28 June 1945
- Decommissioned: 12 June 1975
- Stricken: 27 June 1975
- Fate: Scrapped, 2022
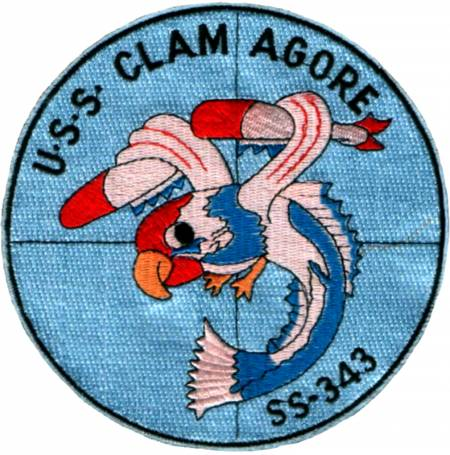
- Badge

General characteristics (World War II)
- Class & type: Balao-class diesel-electric submarine
- Displacement: 1,526 tons (1,550 t) surfaced; 2,424 tons (2,460 t) submerged
- Length: 311 ft 9 in (95.0 m)
- Beam: 27 ft 3 in (8.3 m)
- Draft: 16 ft 10 in (5.1 m) maximum
- Propulsion: 4 × General Motors Model 16-278A V16 diesel engines driving electrical generators; 2 × 126-cell Sargo batteries; 4 × high-speed General Electric electric motors with reduction gears; 2 × propellers; 5,400 shp (4.0 MW) surfaced; 2,740 shp (2.0 MW) submerged
- Speed: 20.25 kn (37.50 km/h; 23.30 mph) surfaced; 8.75 kn (16.21 km/h; 10.07 mph) submerged
- Range: 11,000 nmi (20,000 km; 13,000 mi) surfaced at 10 kn (19 km/h; 12 mph)
- Endurance: 48 hours at 2 kn (3.7 km/h; 2.3 mph) submerged; 75 days on patrol
- Test depth: 400 ft (122 m)
- Complement: 10 officers, 70–71 enlisted
- Armament: 10 × 21-inch (533 mm) torpedo tubes; 6 forward, 4 aft; 24 torpedoes; 1 × 5-inch (127 mm) / 25 caliber deck gun; Bofors 40 mm and Oerlikon 20 mm cannon

General characteristics (Guppy II)
- Displacement: 1,870 tons (1,900 t) surfaced; 2,440 tons (2,480 t) submerged
- Length: 307 ft (93.6 m)
- Beam: 27 ft 4 in (8.3 m)
- Draft: 17 ft (5.2 m)
- Propulsion: Snorkel added; Batteries upgraded to GUPPY type, capacity expanded to 504 cells (1 × 184 cell, 1 × 68 cell, and 2 × 126 cell batteries); 4 × high-speed electric motors replaced with 2 × low-speed direct drive electric motors
- Speed: Surfaced: 18.0 kn (33.3 km/h; 20.7 mph) maximum; 13.5 kn (25.0 km/h; 15.5 mph) cruising; Submerged: 16.0 kn (29.6 km/h; 18.4 mph) for 1/2 hour; 9.0 kn (16.7 km/h; 10.4 mph) snorkeling; 3.5 kn (6.5 km/h; 4.0 mph) cruising
- Range: 15,000 nmi (28,000 km; 17,000 mi) surfaced at 11 kn (20 km/h; 13 mph)
- Endurance: 48 hours at 4 kn (7.4 km/h; 4.6 mph) submerged
- Complement: 9–10 officers; 5 petty officers; 70 enlisted men
- Sensors & processing systems: WFA active sonar; JT passive sonar; Mk 106 torpedo fire control system
- Armament: 10 × 21 in (533 mm) torpedo tubes; (6 forward, 4 aft); all guns removed

General characteristics (Guppy III)
- Displacement: 1,975 tons (2,007 t) surfaced; 2,450 tons (2,489 t) submerged
- Length: 321 ft (98 m)
- Speed: Surfaced: 17.2 kn (31.9 km/h; 19.8 mph) maximum; 12.2 kn (22.6 km/h; 14.0 mph) cruising; Submerged: 14.5 kn (26.9 km/h; 16.7 mph) for 1/2 hour; 6.2 kn (11.5 km/h; 7.1 mph) snorkeling; 3.7 kn (6.9 km/h; 4.3 mph) cruising
- Range: 15,900 nmi (29,400 km; 18,300 mi) surfaced at 8.5 kn (15.7 km/h; 9.8 mph)
- Endurance: 36 hours at 3 kn (5.6 km/h; 3.5 mph) submerged
- Complement: 8–10 officers; 5 petty officers; 70-80 enlisted men
- Sensors & processing systems: BQS-4 active search sonar; BQR-2B passive search sonar; BQG-4 passive attack sonar
- USS Clamagore (Submarine)
- U.S. National Register of Historic Places
- Former U.S. National Historic Landmark
- Location within South Carolina Location within the United States
- Location: Patriot's Point, Mt. Pleasant, South Carolina
- Coordinates: 32°47′19″N 79°54′31″W
- Built: 1963
- Architect: Electric Boat Works
- NRHP reference No.: 89001229

Significant dates
- Added to NRHP: 29 June 1989
- Designated NHL: 29 June 1989
- Delisted NHL: September 2, 2024

USS Clamagore (SS-343) was a Balao-class submarine, which operated as a museum ship at the Patriot's Point Naval & Maritime Museum outside Charleston, South Carolina from 1979 to 2022. Built in 1945 for the United States Navy, she was still in training when World War II ended. She was named for the clamagore. A National Historic Landmark, she was the last surviving example of a GUPPY III type submarine. On 15 October 2022, Clamagore, stripped of sail and superstructure was removed from Patriots Point and towed to Norfolk, Virginia to begin final recycling.

== Construction ==
Clamagore was built by the Electric Boat Company in Groton, Connecticut near the end of World War II. She was launched on 25 February 1945 and sponsored by Miss Mary Jane Jacobs, daughter of Vice Admiral Randall Jacobs and commissioned on 28 June 1945.

== Operational history ==
Clamagore was first assigned to Key West, Florida, and reported there on 5 September 1945. She operated off Key West with various fleet units and with the Fleet Sonar School, voyaging on occasion to Cuba and the Virgin Islands until 5 December 1947, when she entered Philadelphia Naval Shipyard for GUPPY II modernization and installation of a snorkel.

Clamagore returned to Key West 6 August 1948 and assumed local and Caribbean operations for the next eight years, except for a tour of duty in the Mediterranean from 3 February to 16 April 1953.

Clamagore called at New London, Connecticut and Newport, Rhode Island early in 1957, returning to Key West 13 March. Between 23 September and 7 December she took part in NATO exercises in the North Atlantic, calling at Portsmouth, England, and Naval Station Argentia, Newfoundland. On 29 June 1959, she arrived at Charleston, her new home port, and after a period of coastwise operations, sailed 5 April 1960 to join the 6th Fleet in the Mediterranean for a tour of duty which continued until July, when the submarine returned to Charleston. For the remainder of 1960, Clamagore operated off the east coast.

In 1962, Clamagore became one of only nine boats to undergo the GUPPY III conversion. She had a 15 ft (4.6 m) hull extension added forward of the control room, a plastic sail and the BQG-4 PUFFS passive ranging sonar, which included the three sharkfin sensors on her deck.

Clamagore finished her GUPPY III conversion in February 1963, and was transferred to Submarine Squadron 2 (SUBRON2) in Groton, Connecticut.

== Post operational history ==
Clamagore was decommissioned on 12 June 1975 and stricken on 27 June 1975 after having served in the Navy for thirty years. She was donated as a museum ship on 6 August 1979.

Clamagore arrived at Patriot's Point Naval & Maritime Museum, Charleston, South Carolina in May 1981, where she was moored as a museum ship along with aircraft carrier Yorktown and destroyer Laffey.

Clamagore was listed on the National Register of Historic Places and designated a National Historic Landmark on 29 June 1989.

According to the South Carolina Department of Archives and History, Clamagore was the last surviving GUPPY type III submarine in the United States. The GUPPY conversion submarines constituted the bulk of the nation's submarine force through the mid-1960s.

Due to severe degradation of the hull the Patriot Point museum had, on several occasions, looked for an alternate means to preserve the vessel. On 10 January 2017 the Palm Beach County Commissioners voted unanimously to approve funds for the vessel to be sunk as an artificial reef. On 16 April 2019 a group of retired submariners sued the State of South Carolina to save the Clamagore. In early 2020, the museum formed a plan to sink Clamagore at the Vermilion Reef site before the 2021 hurricane season. The next year, the museum announced plans to scrap the submarine as the cost of preservation was considered unsupportable.

During the summer of 2022, the museum began the process of scrapping the Clamagore. Her National Historic Landmark designation was withdrawn in September 2024.

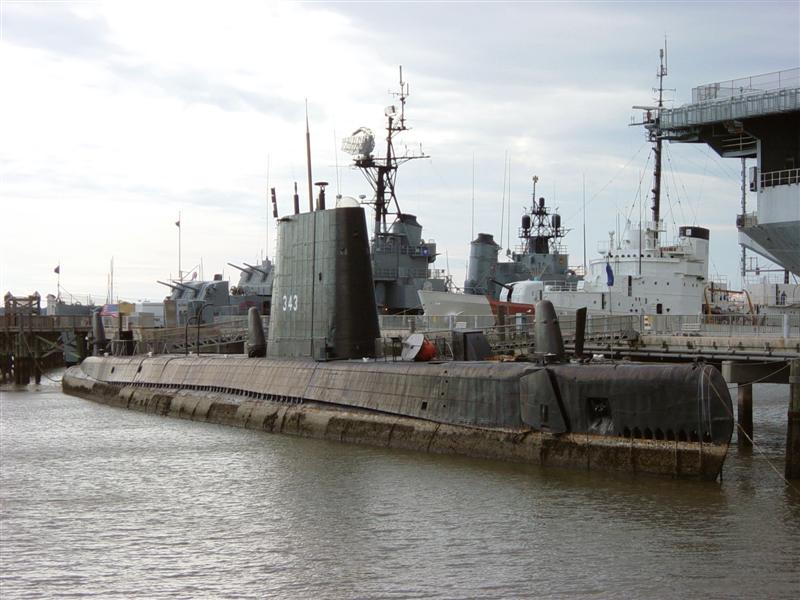
USS Clamagore, 24 November 2003 (the three distinctive shark-fin domes are the PUFFS sonar).

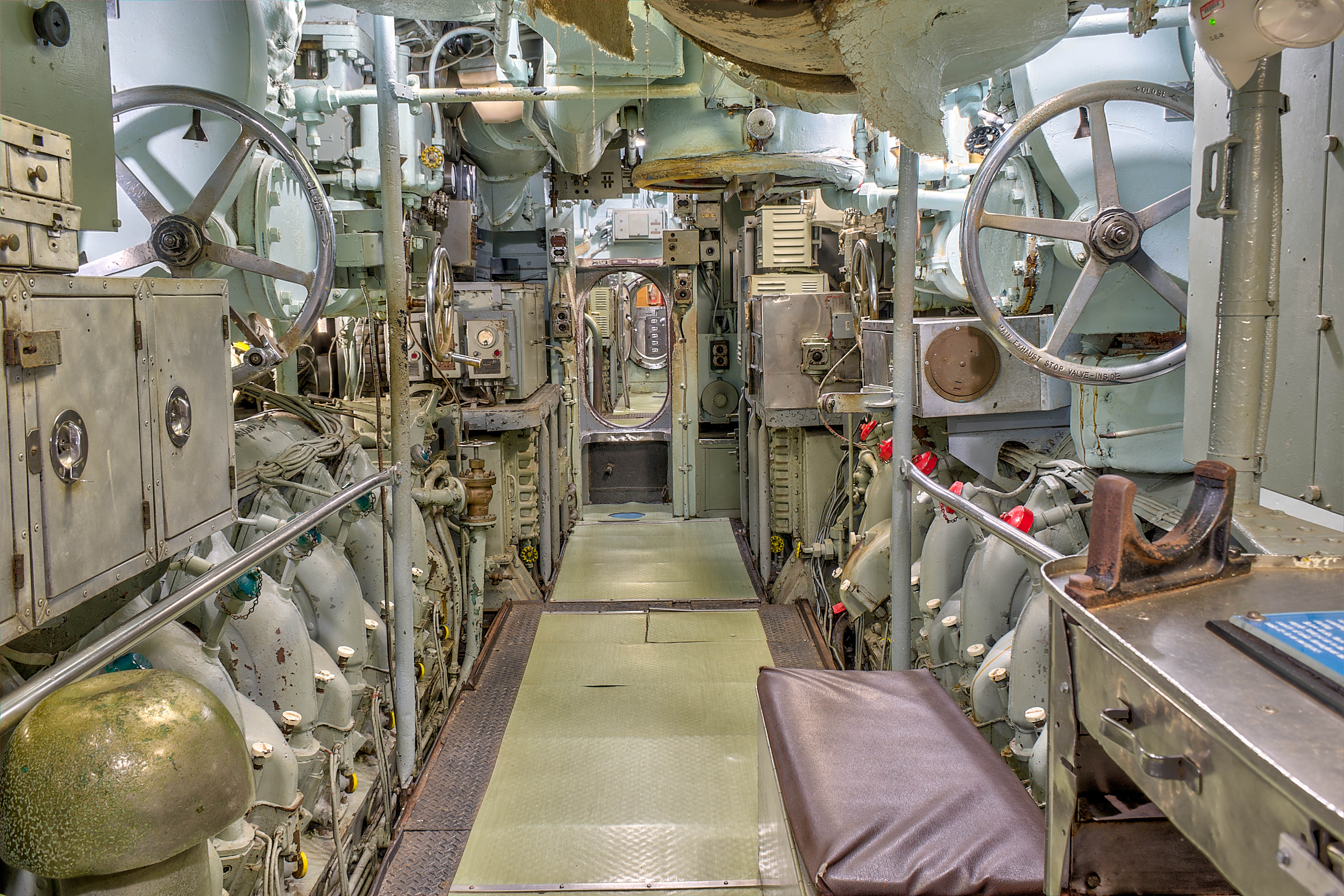
Interior of USS Clamagore

== Awards ==
- Meritorious Unit Commendation
- Navy Expeditionary Medal
- American Campaign Medal
- World War II Victory Medal
- Navy Occupation Medal with "EUROPE" clasp
- National Defense Service Medal with star

== See also ==
- List of National Historic Landmarks in South Carolina
- National Register of Historic Places listings in Charleston, South Carolina
