= Rodgers Beach, Aruba =

Beach in Aruba

Rodgers Beach Nanki
- Beach and village
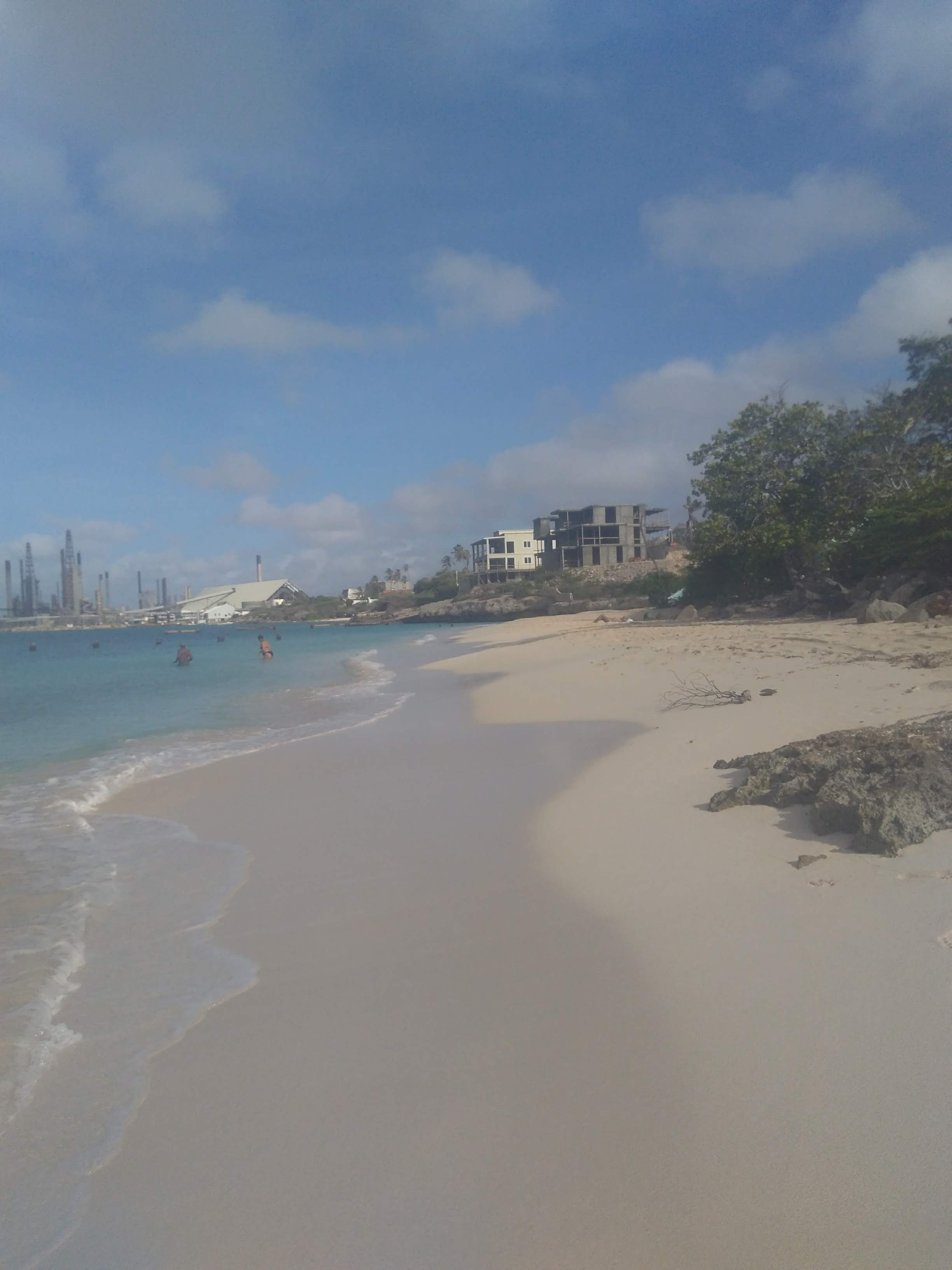

- Location in Aruba
- Country: Aruba
- Region: San Nicolas Zuid

Rodgers Beach, Aruba, officially known as Nanki is a small beach immediately west of Baby Beach. It is known for its calm waters and private feel, though it is a public beach. The water is shallow at first, but further out it becomes a good swimming beach.

== History ==
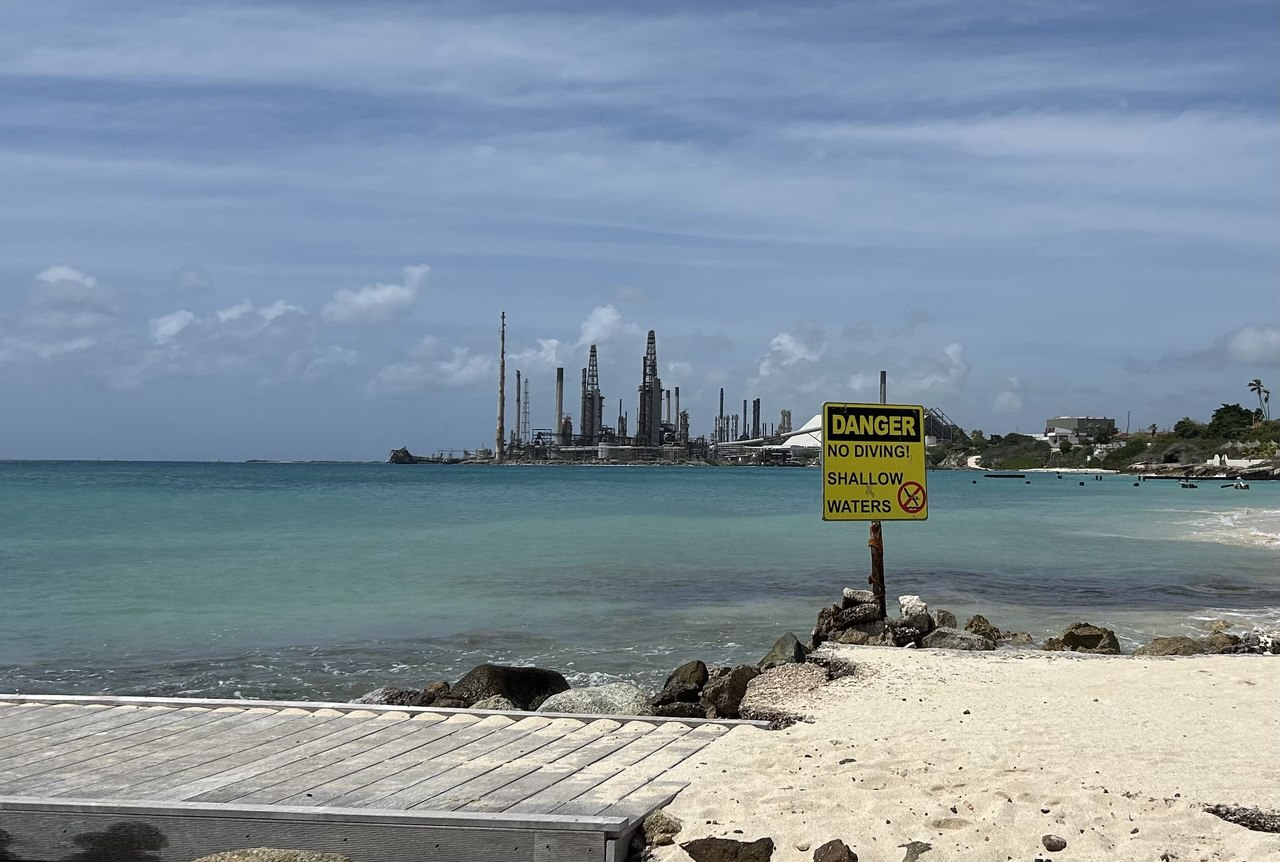
Rodgers beach

In the 1950s, the Aruba Esso Club was built as a part of Lago Colony (near present-day Seroe Colorado) at Baby Beach, immediately to the south of Rodgers Beach. The club included a restaurant, dance floor, and baseball stadium. There was a dock in the lagoon, and there were small shacks, one of which is still standing. Today, it is no more than a large, abandoned building with one business, a dive shop, still in operation. The beach has been named after Captain Robert Rodgers who was in charge of the oil refinery at San Nicolaas.

== See also ==
- Lago Colony
