= Palm Island, Aruba =

Island in Aruba

Palm Island
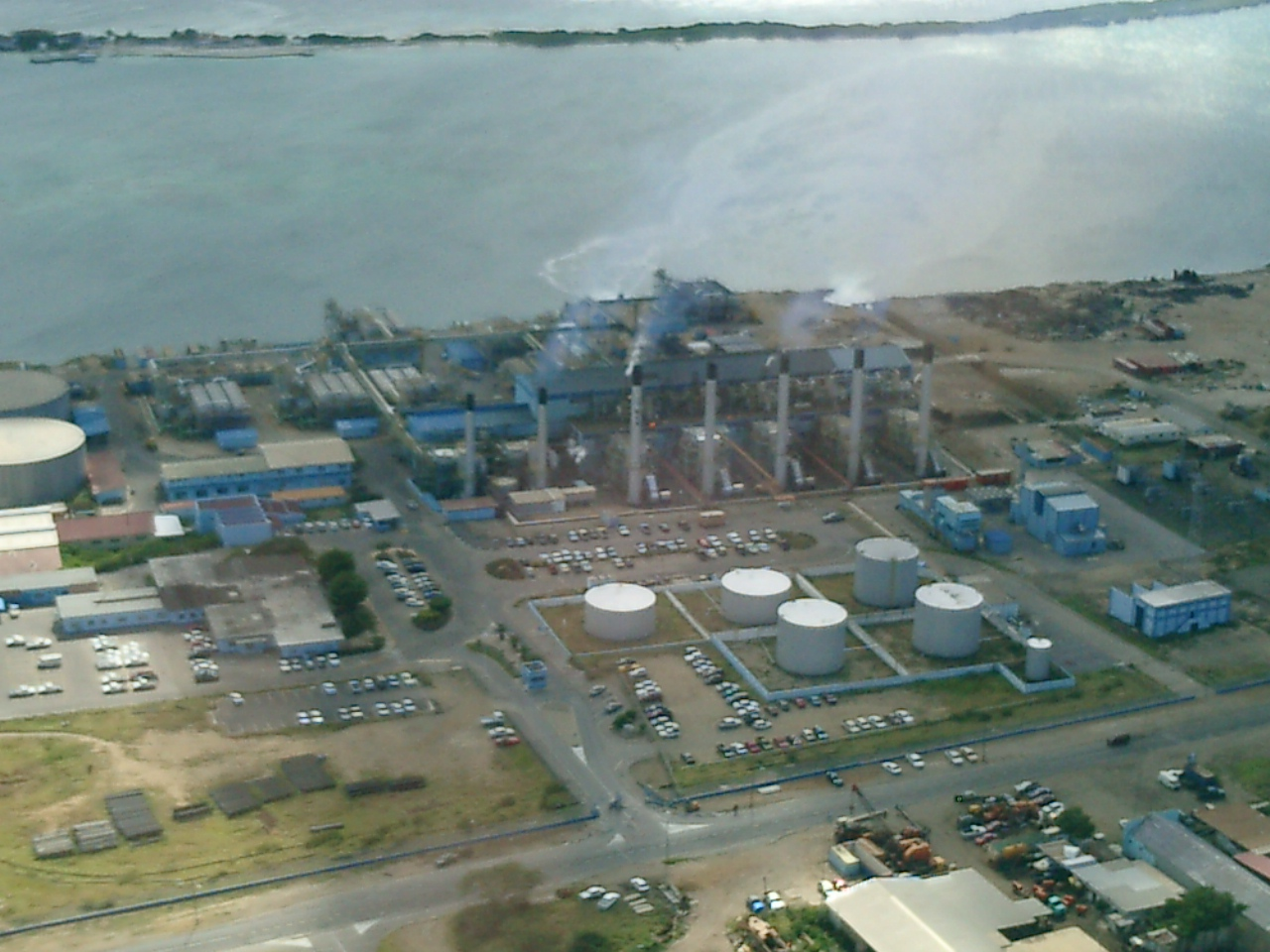
- De Palm Island Ferry Terminal at Oranjestad, Aruba.

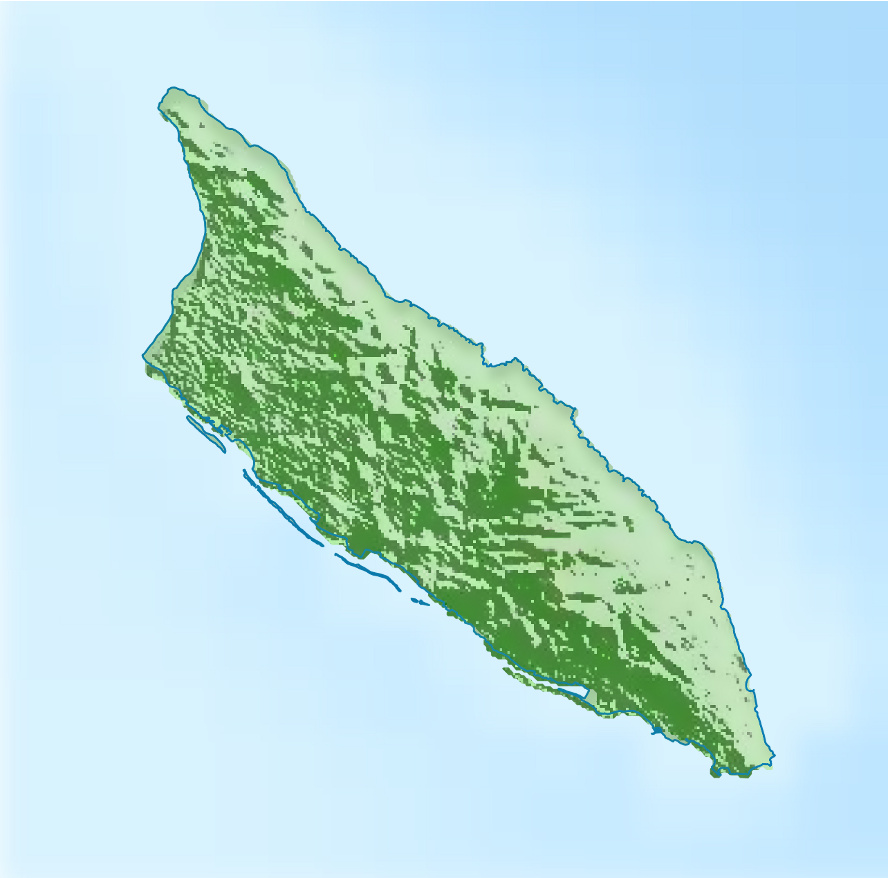
- Location within Aruba Location within Lesser Antilles Location within the Caribbean

Geography
- Location: Caribbean
- Coordinates: 12°28′11″N 69°59′05″W
- Archipelago: Leeward Islands, Lesser Antilles
- Area: 0.1 km^{2} (0.039 sq mi)

Administration
- Aruba

Additional information
- Time zone: AST (UTC-4)

De Palm Island is a small private island near Aruba, Kingdom of the Netherlands, serving as a tourist attraction.

The island is a 5-minute ferry ride from the mainland. The island includes a small beach and a water park.

== Tourist attractions ==
The beach area extends a short distance into the ocean. It is forbidden to go far out from the beach, to protect both people and life in the sea.

Blue Parrotfish Water Park has water-slides and a little pool. The island has an "all-you-can-eat" buffet beverage, and giftshops.

Snorkeling is one of the main activities on the island, as many of Aruba's many species of fish exist here, including the blue parrotfish.

Water park visitors, equipped with an underwater SeaTREK helmet diving system, can visit the tropical fish world of the coral island on foot and also take underwater shots of a downed and submerged Cessna 414 aircraft. Non-swimmers and people without a diving experience also can use the Sea Trek helmet system.
