= Daimari =

Bay in Aruba

- Beach
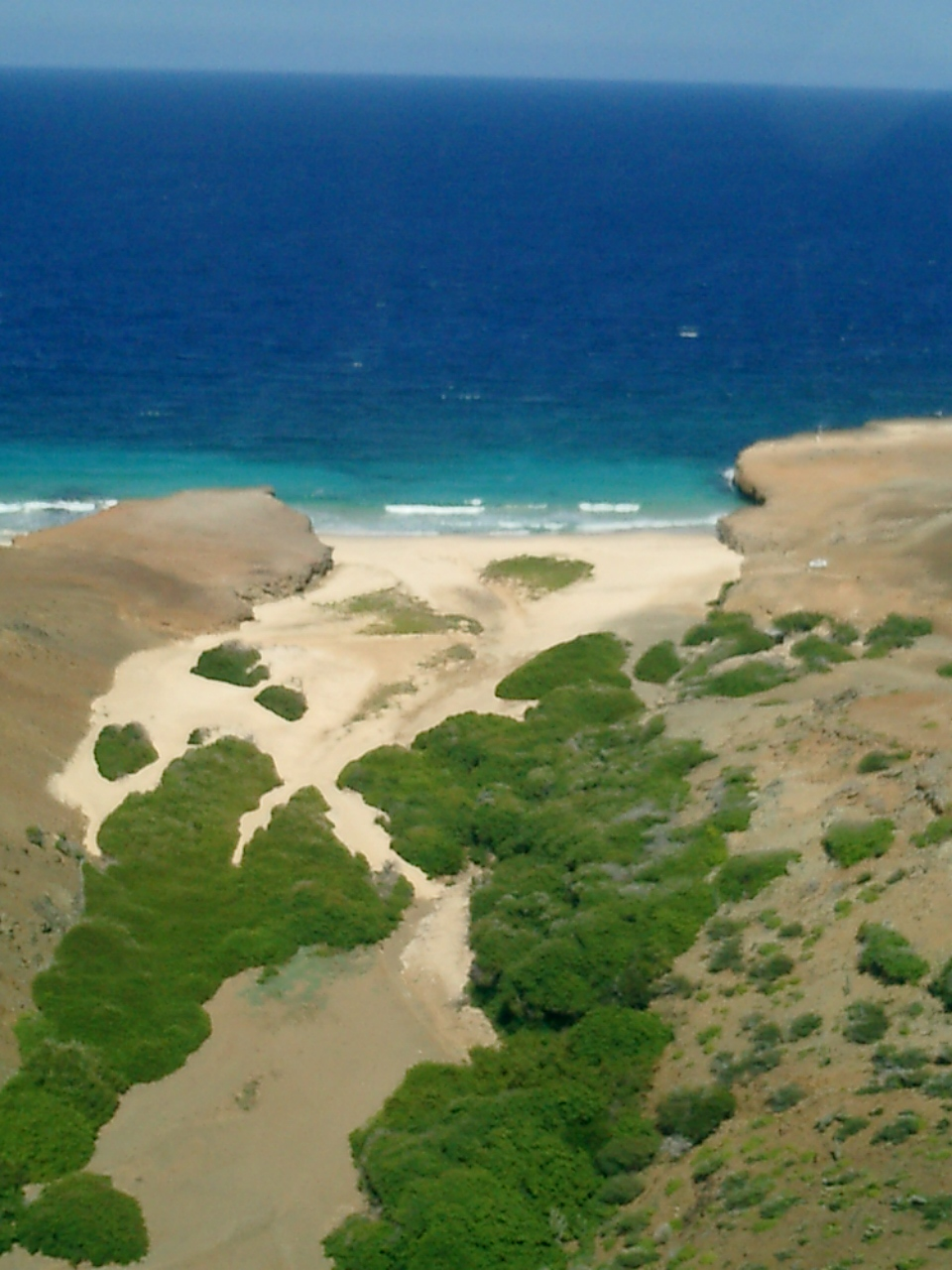

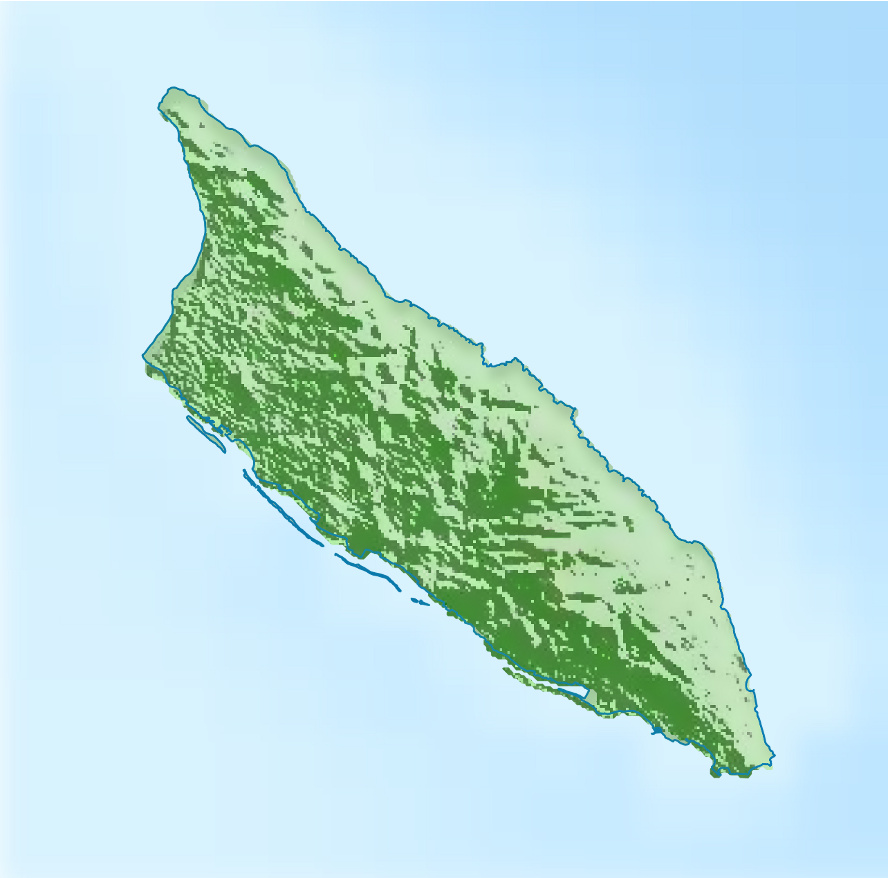
- Location in Aruba
- Coordinates: 12.53025°N 69.93997°W
- Location: Arikok National Park, Aruba

Daimari is a bay on the northern coast of Aruba, on the north end of Arikok National Park.
