= Lago Colony =

- Village
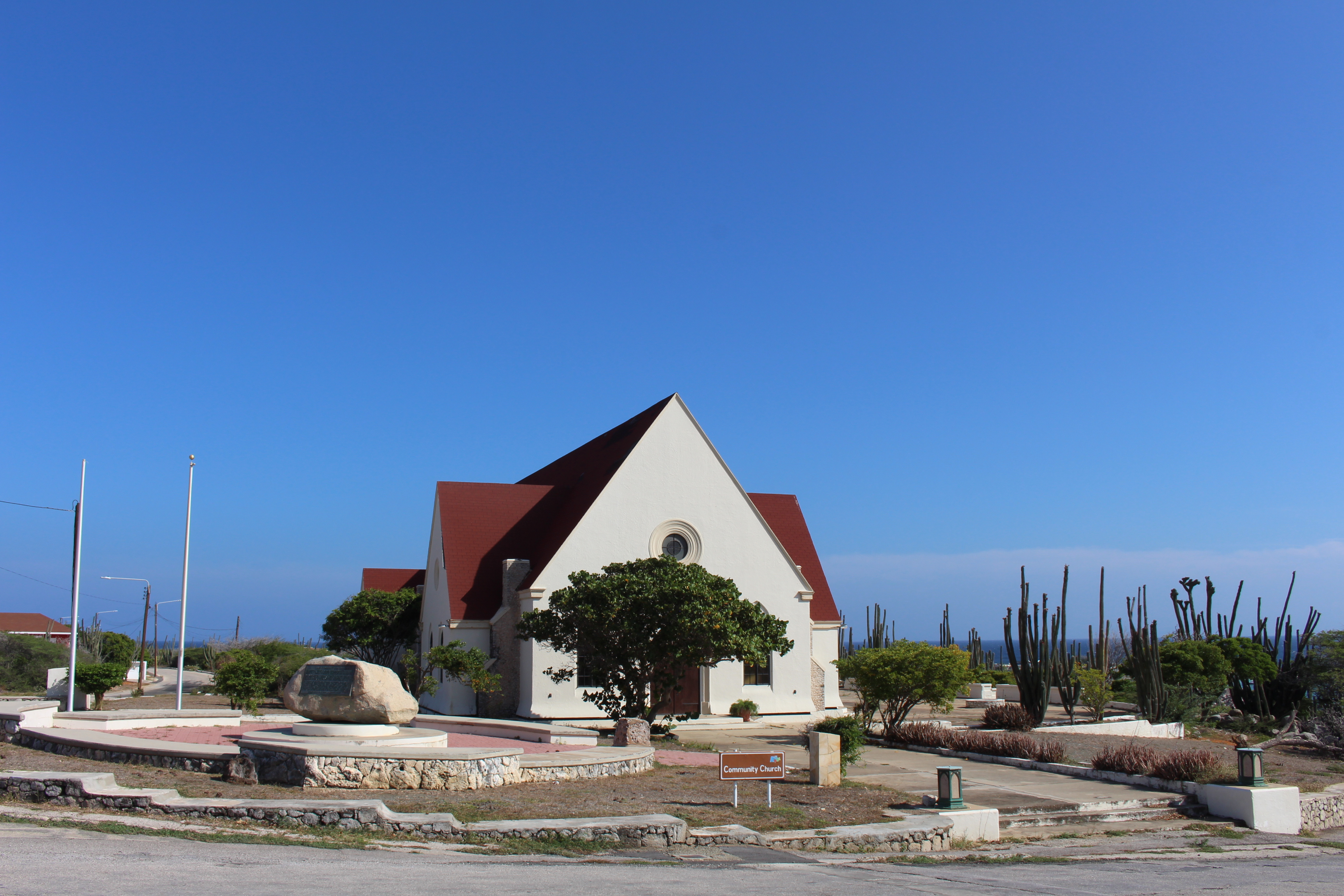
- Community church in Lago Colony

- Location in Aruba
- Coordinates: 12°24′56″N 69°52′55″W
- Country: Aruba
- Region: San Nicolas Zuid

Population (2010)
  - Total: 1,112

Lago Colony was a community located on the east end of the island of Aruba, near the area presently known as Seroe Colorado.

The town consisted of 377 homes, a hospital, church, club house, bowling alley, and an American School, with first through twelfth grades and approximately 180 students. The population of Lago Colony was primarily from the United States, although there was a large population from England, Ireland, and Scotland who were primarily officers on the lake tanker fleet. In addition there were Dutch, Danish, Spanish and other nationalities represented in the community. This town was supported by a large oil refinery in the world, which at that time was owned by a subsidiary of Standard Oil of New Jersey, known as Lago Oil and Transport Company. Lago had its beginning in 1924 as a trans-shipping facility for crude oil extracted by the Lago Petroleum Corporation operating in Lake Maracaibo. The crude oil was transported to Aruba in flat bottom, shallow draft, tanker ships, known as lake tankers. This trans-shipping of the crude oil continued until 1928 when a refinery was built and the Venezuelan crude oil was then refined on the island and shipped all over the world as finished petroleum products.

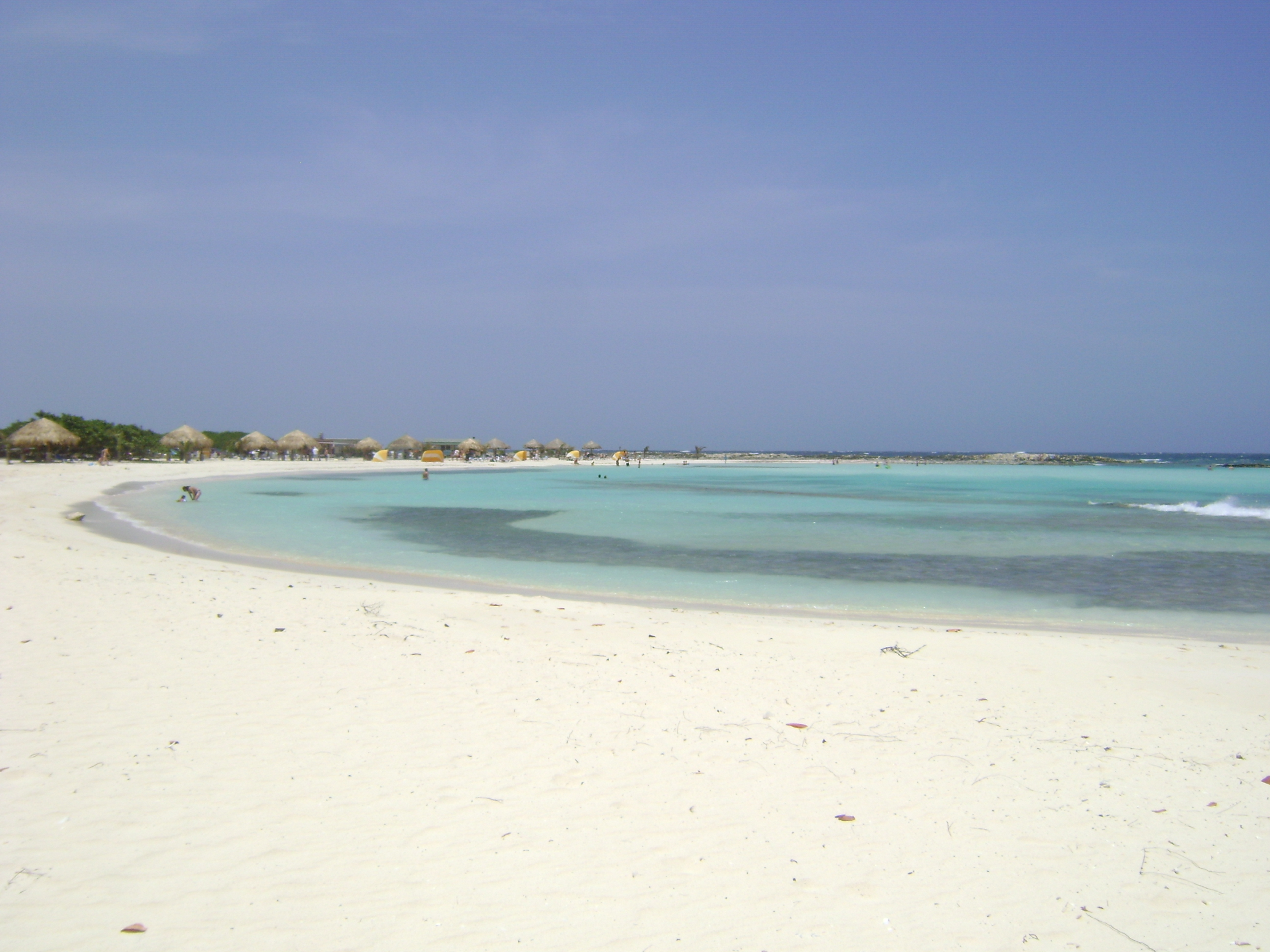
Baby beach

In the 1950s, the Aruba Esso Club was built at Baby Beach man made lagoon. The club included a restaurant, dance floor, and a baseball stadium. In the lagoon, there was a dock and small shacks (one of which is still standing). The refinery operated until 1985 when it was shut down. The refinery, now owned by Valero Energy Corporation, was later purchased, reopened, then shut down again; in December 2010, Valero announced that the refinery was reopening. As of 2012, only a few houses of the former Lago Colony remain. Those that remain have been handed over to the Aruban Government or sold to individuals. Today, the Esso Club is only one large, abandoned building with one business, a dive shop, still in operation.

== See also ==
- Baby Beach, Aruba
- Arend Petroleum Company
