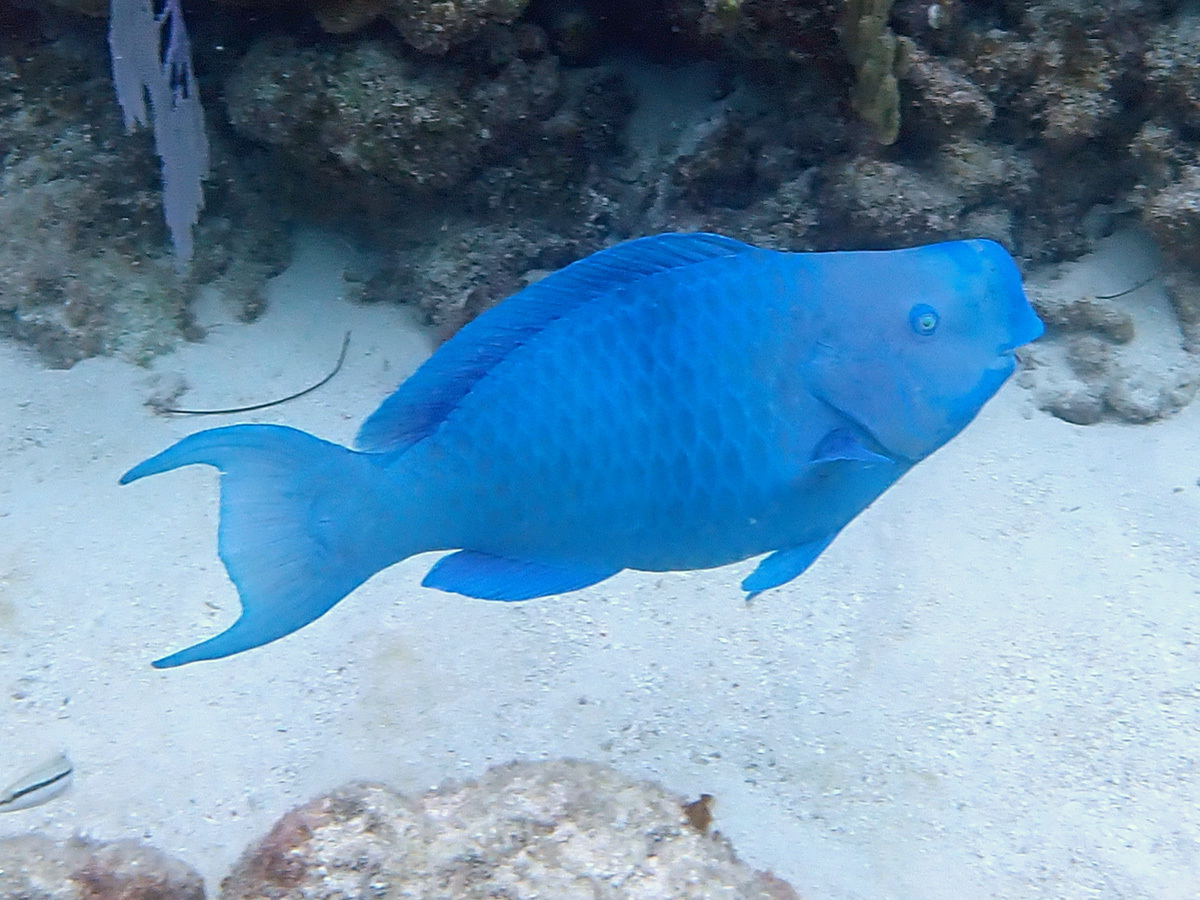
- Blue parrotfish in Florida

Conservation status
- Least Concern (IUCN 3.1)

Scientific classification
- Kingdom: Animalia
- Phylum: Chordata
- Class: Actinopterygii
- Division: Teleostei
- Order: Labriformes
- Family: Labridae
- Genus: Scarus
- Species: S. coeruleus

Binomial name
- Scarus coeruleus Edwards, 1771
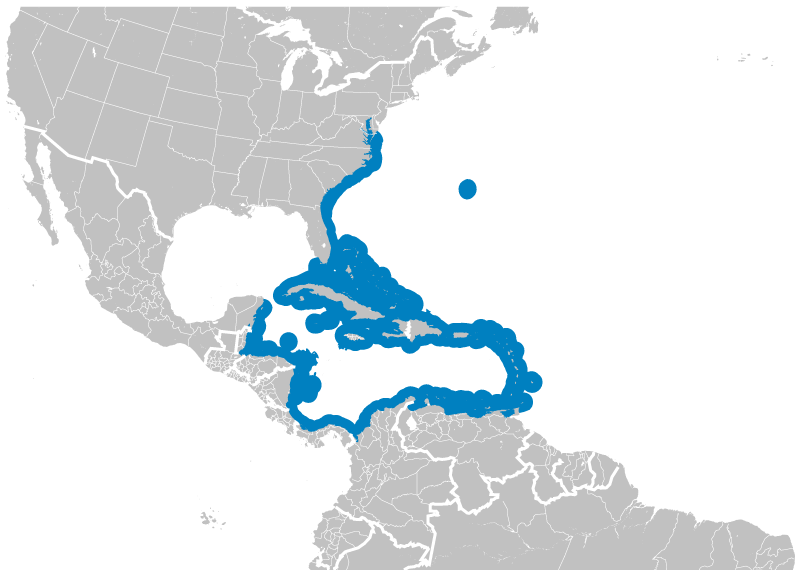
- Blue parrotfish range.

Synonyms
- Coryphaena coerulea Edwards, 1771; Coryphaena coerulea Bloch, 1786; Scarus coeruleus (Bloch, 1786); Scarus loro Bloch & Schneider, 1801; Calliodon gibbosus Bloch & Schneider, 1801; Scarus trilobatus Lacépède, 1802; Sparus holocyaneos Lacepède, 1802; Scarus obtusus Poey, 1860; Scarus nuchalis Poey, 1860

= Blue parrotfish =

Species of fish

The blue parrotfish (Scarus coeruleus) is a member of the parrotfish genus Scarus. It is found on coral reefs in shallow water in the tropical and subtropical parts of the western Atlantic Ocean and the Caribbean Sea. They usually forage in a group of 500 individuals for spawning and deterring predators while feeding.

Blue Parrotfish (Scarus coeruleus) feeding near the drop-off to the reef on Bonaire (Caribbean Netherlands).

== Description ==
They are uniformly blue with a yellow spot on their heads that fades as they age. They average 30 to 75 centimetres (12 to 30 in) in length with a maximum length of 1.2 metres (3 ft 11 in). They develop a large "beak" like other parrotfish that is used for scraping algae and small organisms from rocks. They have pharyngeal teeth that grind ingested rocks into sand. No other species has this uniform blue color as adults. They weigh about 9.1 kilograms (20 lb).

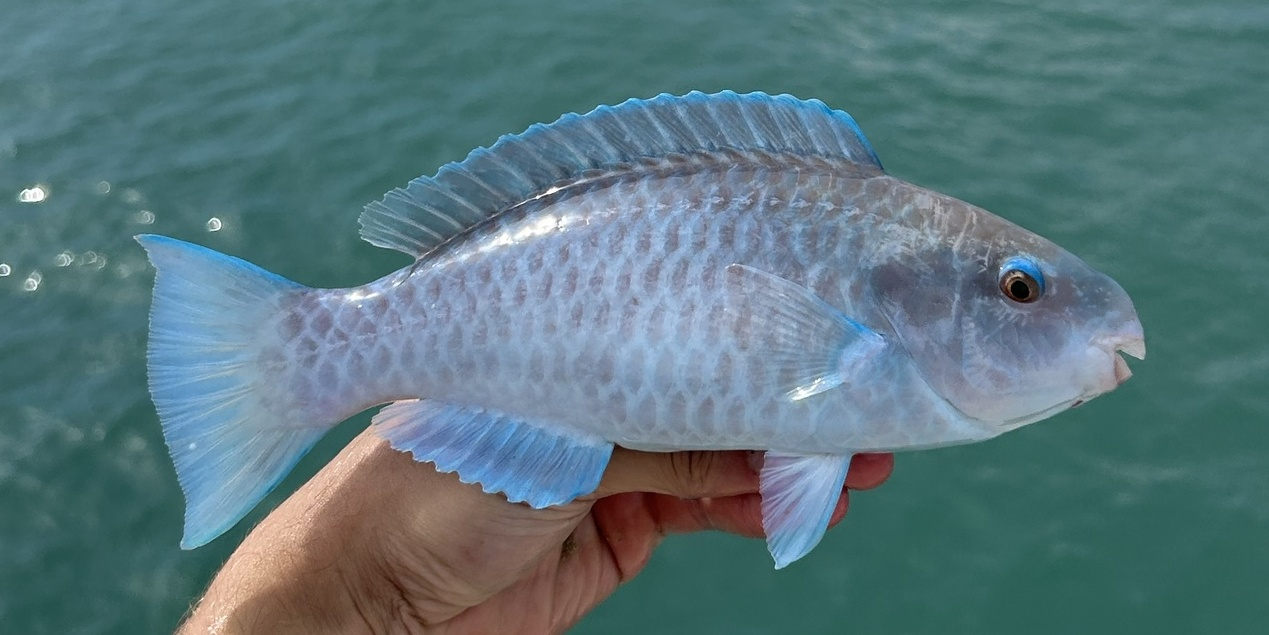
In Florida

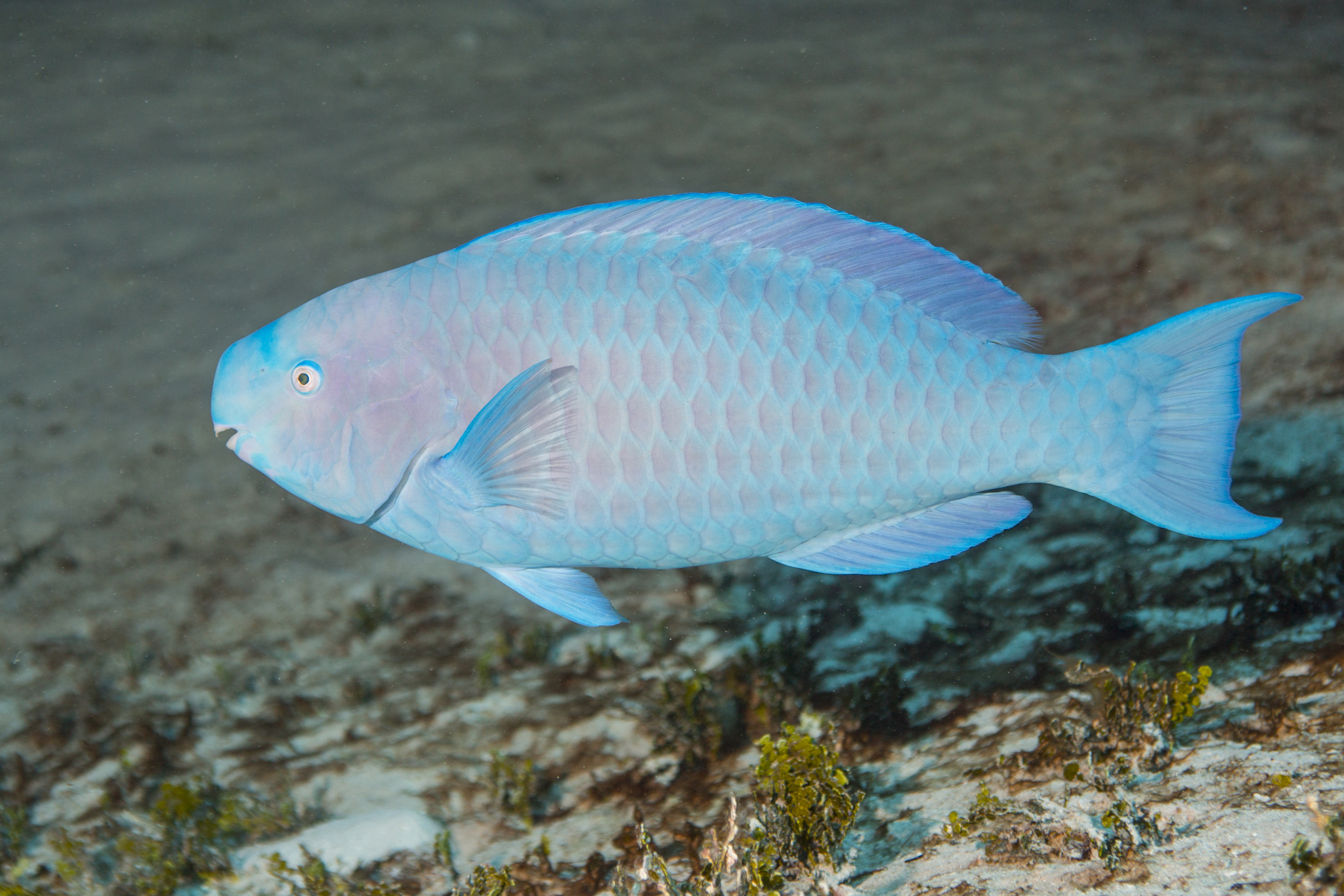
In the Bahamas

== Reproduction ==
In summer, blue parrotfish gather in spawning groups. Sexual interaction occurs and the females deposit their eggs into the water column after which they sink to the seabed. The eggs hatch after about twenty-five hours. Some special characteristics found in only female blue parrotfish are that there is an existence of an annual immature all-female group. The other is that females in the sexually mixed group spawn without any seasonality.

== Distribution and habitat ==
Blue parrotfish are found on coral reefs at depths of 3–25 m (9.8–82.0 ft) in the western Atlantic from Maryland in the United States to Bermuda, the Bahamas, and south to Brazil. They are also found throughout the West Indies but are absent from the northern part of the Gulf of Mexico. Juveniles are found in beds of turtle grass (Thalassia testudinum).

The Scarus Coeruleus fish greatly depend on coral reef systems to provide them with various food sources; however, this ecosystem has become threatened, which has now put the blue parrotfish and many other species endangered of becoming extinct from lack of food availability.

== Diet ==
Their diet consists of small organisms found in the algae that they scrape off rocks. They are described as professional sand-suckers, due to their foraging of food amongst the sandy areas that surround the reef. They spend 80 percent of their time searching for food.

== Status ==
The blue parrotfish has a wide range and is abundant in much of that range, some of which are in marine conservation areas. Although larger individuals are targeted by fishermen, the population of this fish seems to be stable overall. For these reasons, the IUCN has listed this fish as being of "Least Concern".
