= Baby Beach, Aruba =

Beach in Aruba

Baby Beach Klein Lagoen
- Beach and village
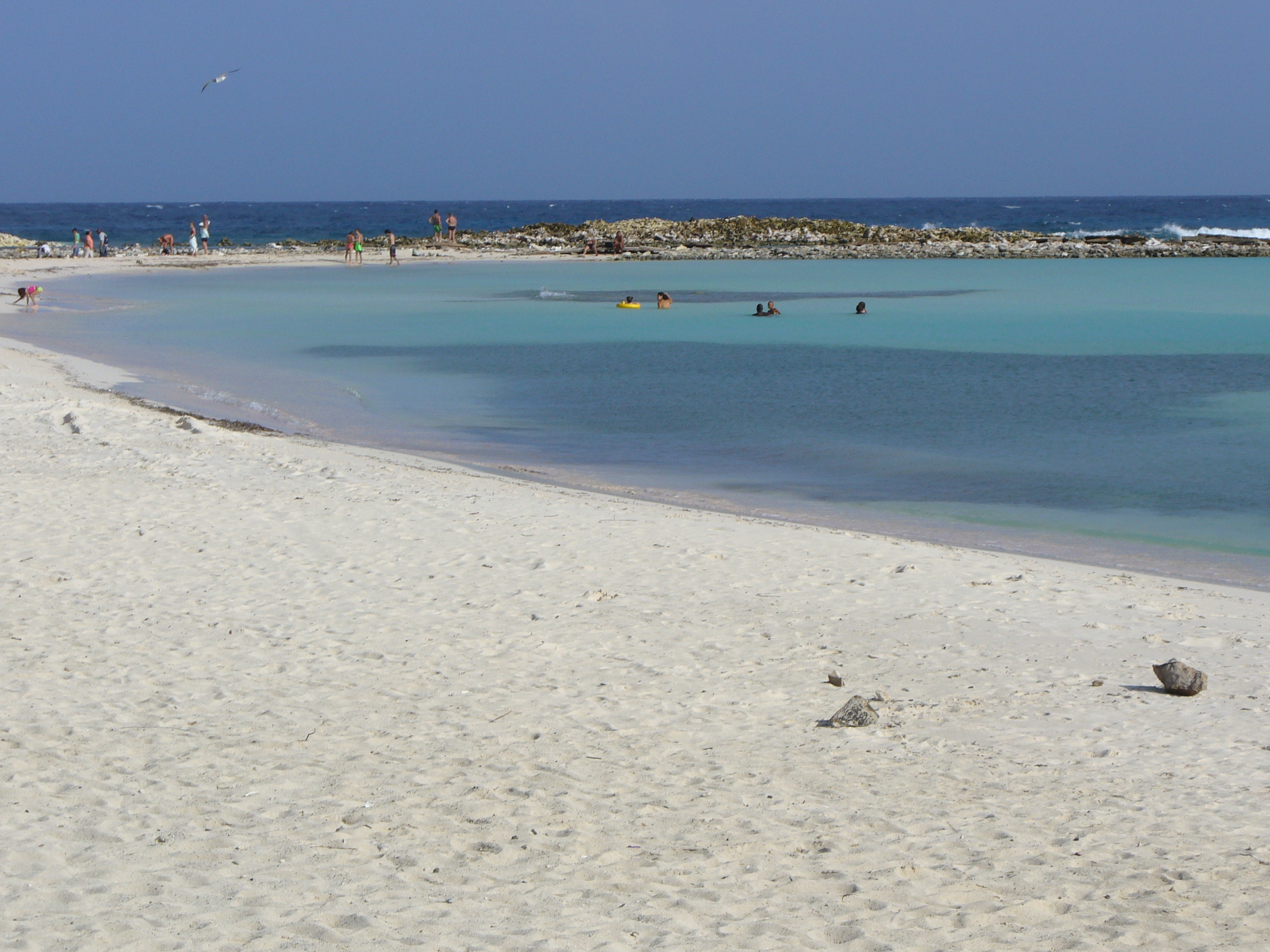

- Location of Mangle Cora in Aruba
- Coordinates: 12°24′50″N 69°52′47″W
- Country: Aruba
- Region: San Nicolas Zuid

Baby Beach, officially known as Klein Lagoen, is a shallow, sheltered, man-altered lagoon in Aruba. It's in the Mangle Cora locality, near the village of Seroe Colorado (formerly Roode Berg), on the southwest side of the southeast end of the island. Frequented by both tourists and locals, it is nicknamed Baby Beach because the water is so calm that it is safe for very small children. Because of the calm water, snorkeling here is safe for both children and those new to snorkeling.

The beach is popular mostly due to the lack of waves and the shallow water. Despite the fact that the "Refineria di Aruba" oil refinery is within sight of Baby Beach, the movement of localized currents leaves the water at Baby Beach clean and clear.

The water level is generally waist high on the inside, but it deepens significantly towards the inlet. Marine life in the lagoon includes barracuda, squid, parrot fish, blowfish, marine angelfish, eels, and many other small fish. The range of most of these animals is limited to the inlet.

At the beach there is a small snack stand, and chairs and umbrellas for rent. Four-wheel-drive cars, for driving around the beach, are also available to rent.

This is not a nude beach. Public nudity is illegal on Aruba. Topless sunbathing is tolerated on beaches in resort areas, though not on resort grounds. Topless beaches include the Renaissance Island and De Palm Island. These islands have adult beach areas where topless sunbathing and swimming are allowed.

== History ==
In the 1950s, the Aruba Esso Club was built as part of Lago Colony (present-day Seroe Colorado), at Baby Beach (on the west side of the lagoon). The club included a restaurant, dance floor, and a baseball stadium. In the lagoon, there was a dock and small shacks (one of which is still standing). Today, there is only one large, abandoned building (with one business, a dive shop, still in operation).

== See also ==
- Lago Colony
