= Ecury =

Ecury or Écury may refer to:

== People ==
- Boy Ecury (1922–1944), member of the Dutch Resistance in World War II
- Nydia Ecury (1926–2012), Afro-Dutch writer, translator and actress

== Places ==
- Écury-le-Repos, Marne department, France
- Écury-sur-Coole, Marne department, France

== See also ==
- Ecurie (disambiguation)
