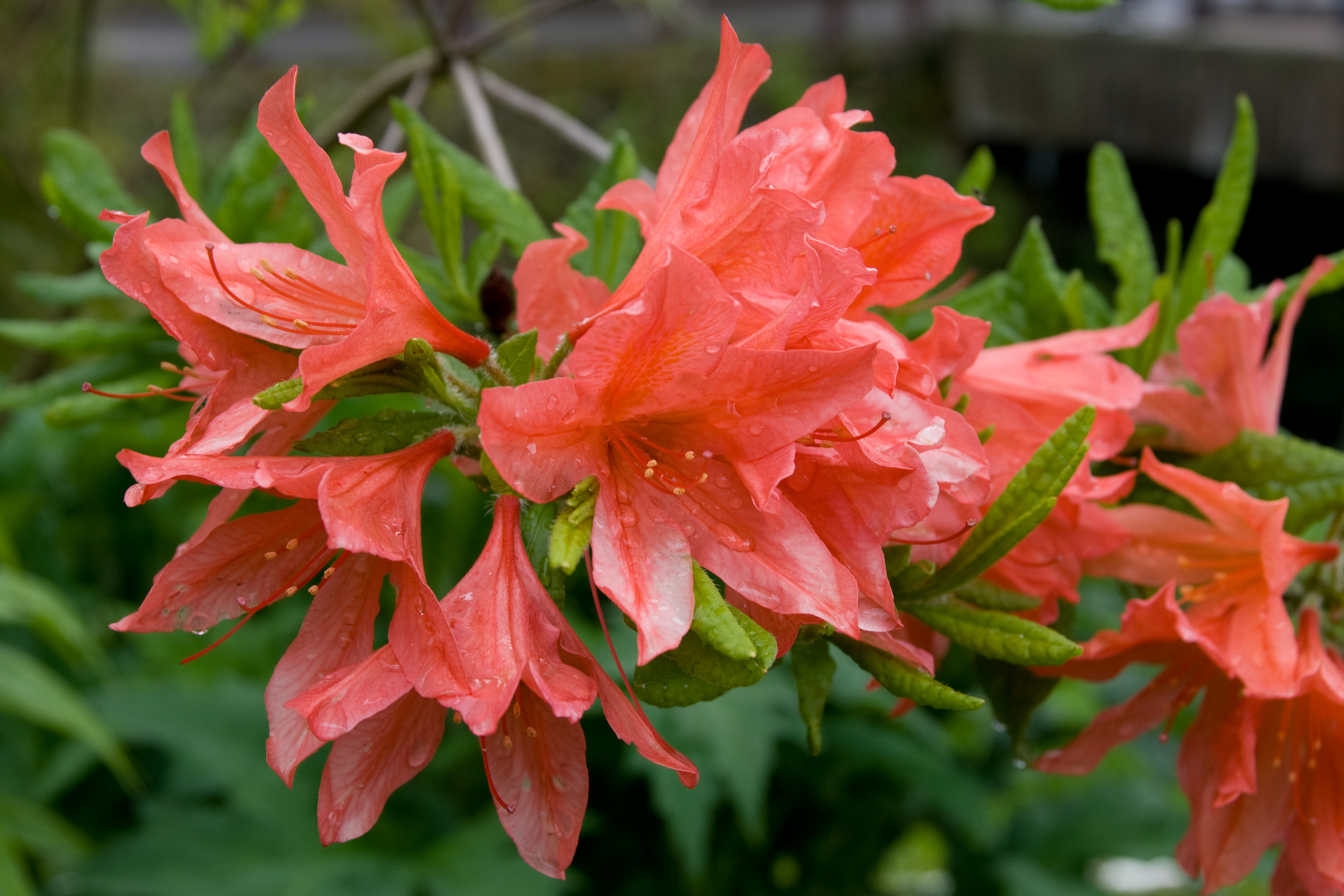
- Flowers
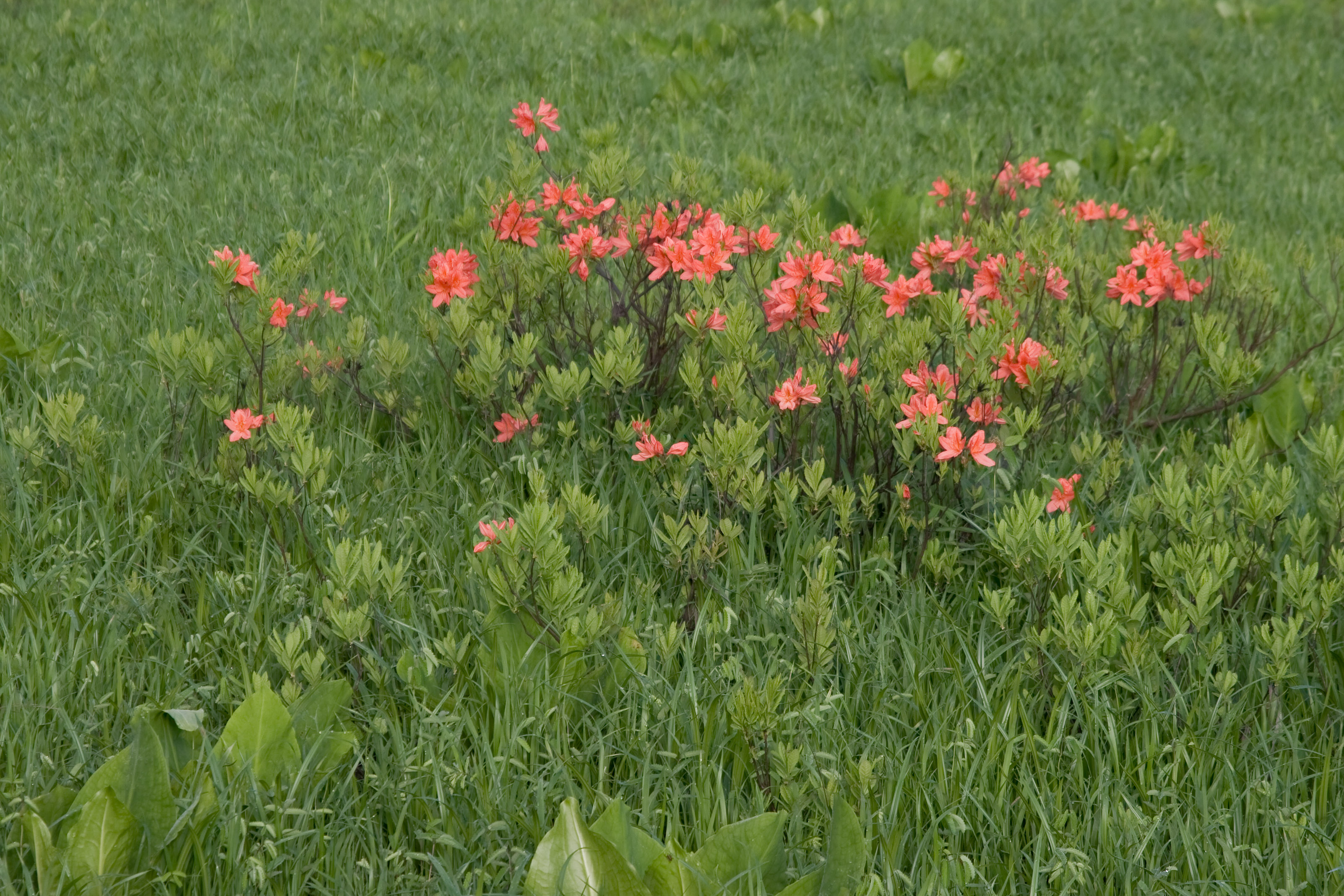
- Habit

Scientific classification
- Kingdom: Plantae
- Clade: Tracheophytes
- Clade: Angiosperms
- Clade: Eudicots
- Clade: Asterids
- Order: Ericales
- Family: Ericaceae
- Genus: Rhododendron
- Species: R. japonicum

Binomial name
- Rhododendron japonicum (A.Gray) Valck.Sur.

Synonyms
- List: Azalea japonica A.Gray; Azalea macrostemon (Maxim.) Kuntze; Azalea mollis var. glabrior (Miq.) Regel; Azalea sinensis var. glabrior (Miq.) Maxim.; Rhododendron japonicum f. aureum E.H.Wilson; Rhododendron japonicum f. canescens Sugim.; Rhododendron japonicum f. flavum (Miyoshi) Nakai; Rhododendron japonicum f. glaucophyllum (Nakai) H.Hara; Rhododendron japonicum var. glaucophyllum Nakai; Rhododendron japonicum f. multifidum Nakai; Rhododendron macrostemon Maxim.; Rhododendron molle f. canescens (Sugim.) Yonek.; Rhododendron molle f. flavum (Miyoshi) Yonek.; Rhododendron molle var. glabrior Miq.; Rhododendron molle f. glaucophyllum (Nakai) Yonek.; Rhododendron molle subsp. japonicum (A.Gray) Kron; Rhododendron molle f. multifidum (Nakai) Yonek.; Rhododendron sinense f. flavum Miyoshi

= Rhododendron japonicum =

Species of plant

Rhododendron japonicum, the Japanese azalea, is a species of flowering plant in the family Ericaceae, native to Japan. A deciduous shrub reaching 8 ft (2.4 m) but usually half that, it is found in grasslands and open scrub, never in dense thickets or woodlands. It is very similar to the Chinese endemic Rhododendron molle, to the extent that its cultivars are customarily grouped with the cultivars of R. molle. It is popularly cultivated as a bonsai tree.

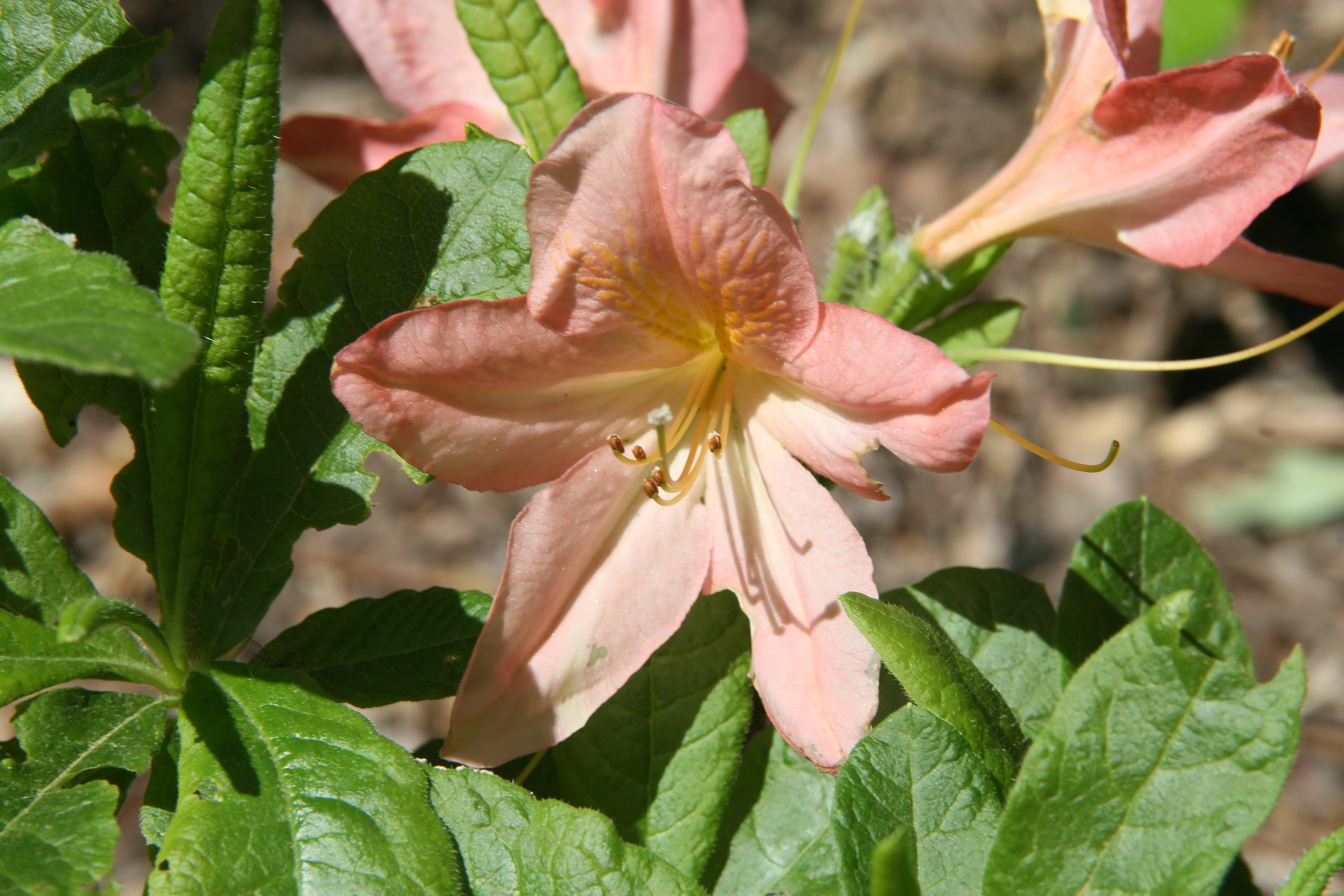
At the United States National Arboretum

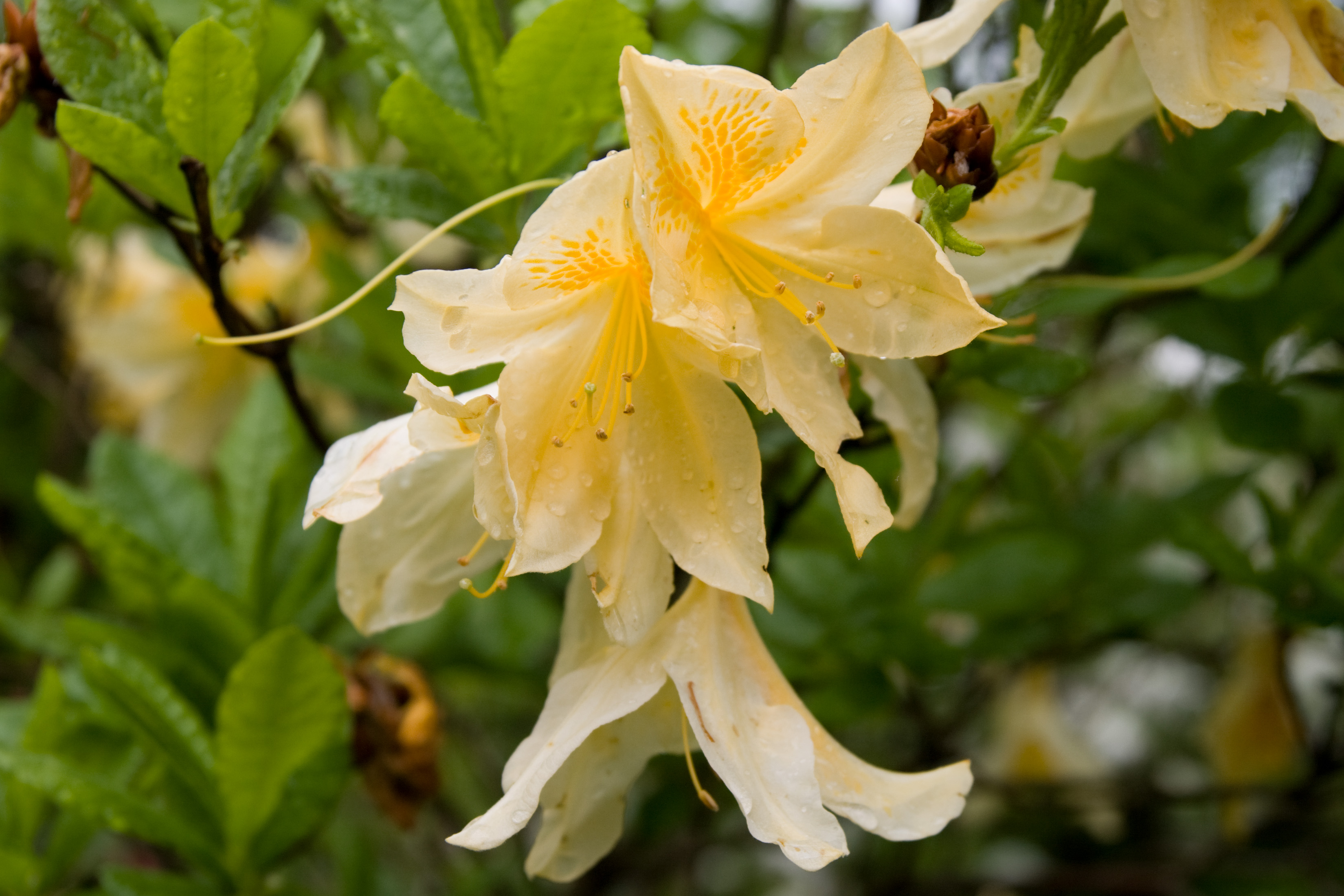
Putative form Rhododendron japonicum f. flavum

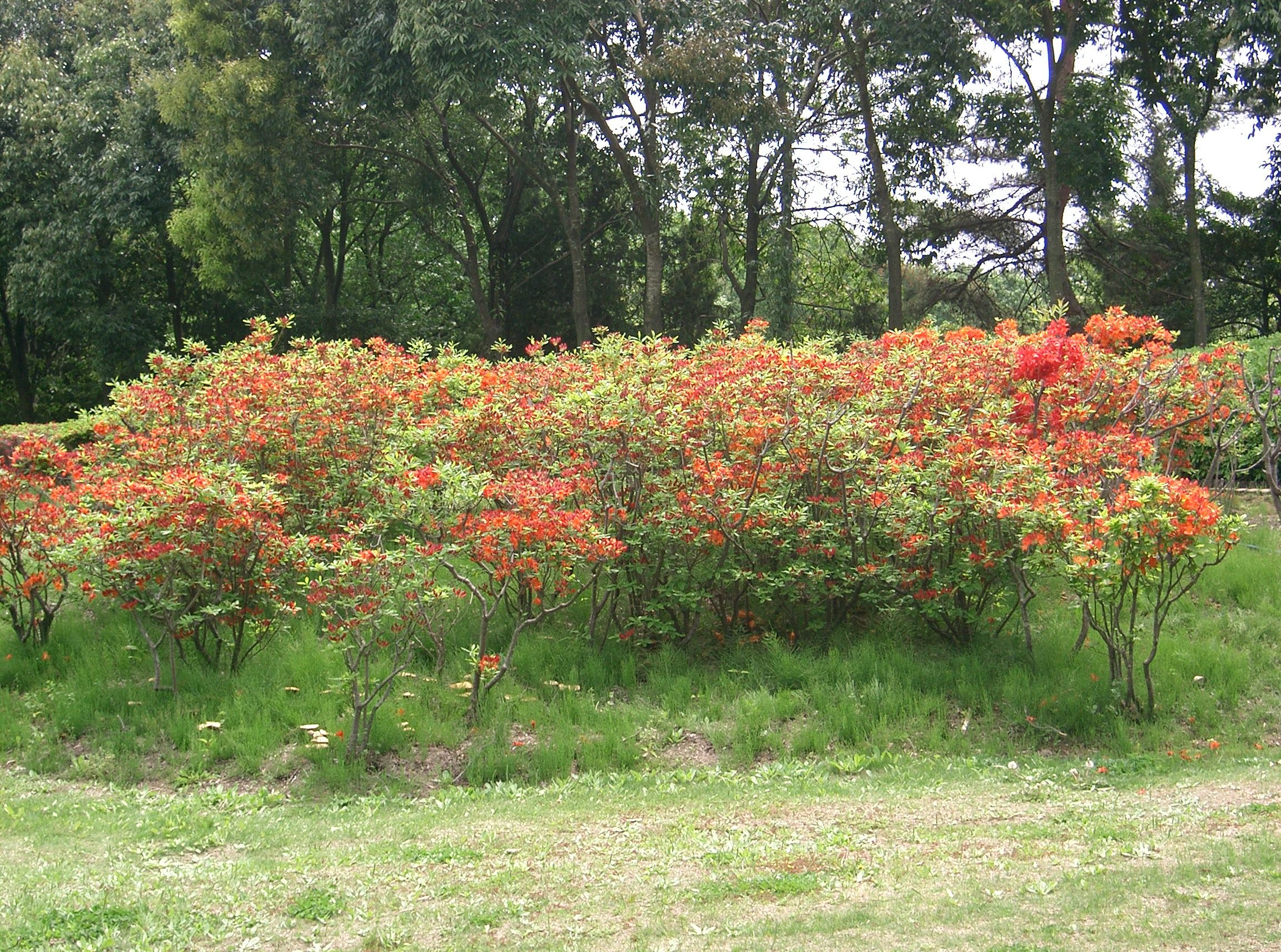
Mass effect
