= Cyperus stenophyllus =

Scientific classification
- Kingdom: Plantae
- Clade: Tracheophytes
- Clade: Angiosperms
- Clade: Monocots
- Clade: Commelinids
- Order: Poales
- Family: Cyperaceae
- Genus: Cyperus
- Species: C. stenophyllus

Binomial name
- Cyperus stenophyllus Valck.Sur., 1912

Species of sedge

Cyperus stenophyllus is a species of sedge that is native to parts of south east Asia.

== See also ==
- List of Cyperus species
