= Rancho, Aruba =

Rancho
- Neighbourhood
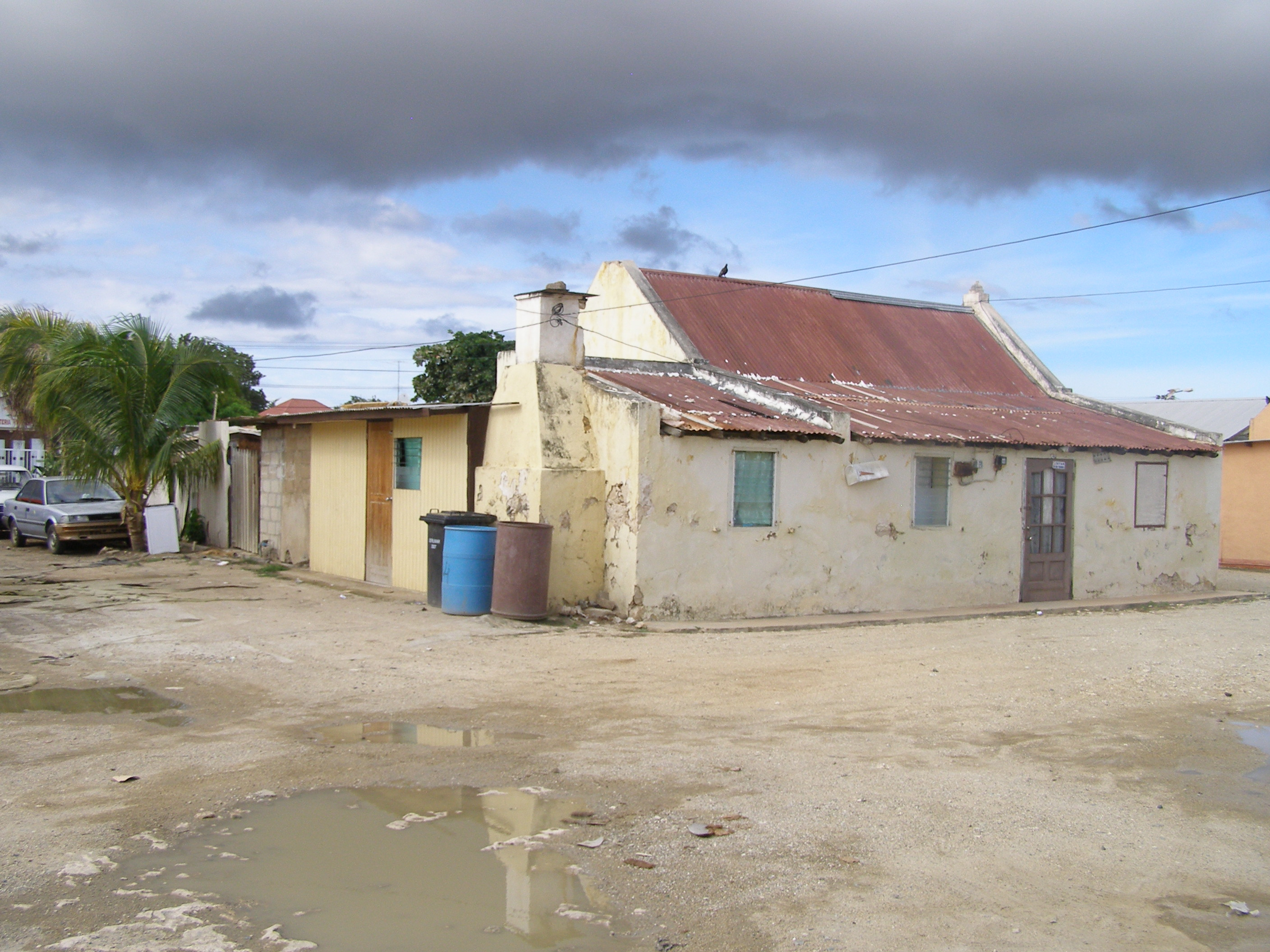
- House in Rancho
- Interactive map of Rancho
- Coordinates: 12.5222°N 70.0363°W
- State: Kingdom of the Netherlands
- Country: Aruba
- Region: Oranjestad West

Area
  - Total: 0.4306 km^{2} (0.1663 sq mi)

Population (2020)
  - Total: 1,561
  - Density: 3,625/km^{2} (9,390/sq mi)

Rancho, located near Paardenbaai, is one of the old districts of Oranjestad, the capital of Aruba. Originally a fishing village, Rancho has evolved into a neighbourhood of Oranjestad. In the late 20th century, it was annexed by Oranjestad, becoming a part of the city while still retaining its distinct character. The district is known for its monuments and intangible cultural heritage.

== History ==
Rancho was initially mentioned in 1855 as a fishing village with small huts located near Oranjestad. The village boasted a modest harbour where ships used to anchor. In 1927, an oil refinery was established near Rancho by Arend Petroleum Company, a subsidiary of Royal Dutch Shell. This development led to a surge in a population and the construction of stone houses.

In the late 20th century, Rancho and Oranjestad merged, forming a unified urban area. To preserve the unique village characteristics, buildings heights are limited to five meters, unless exceptions are granted. Unfortunately, Rancho has experienced economic hardships and is considered an impoverished part of the city.

Recognizing the significance of preserving the former fishing village, the Rancho Foundation was established on April 20, 2010. Its primary objective is to safeguard the historical legacy and cultural heritage of Rancho.

== Overview ==
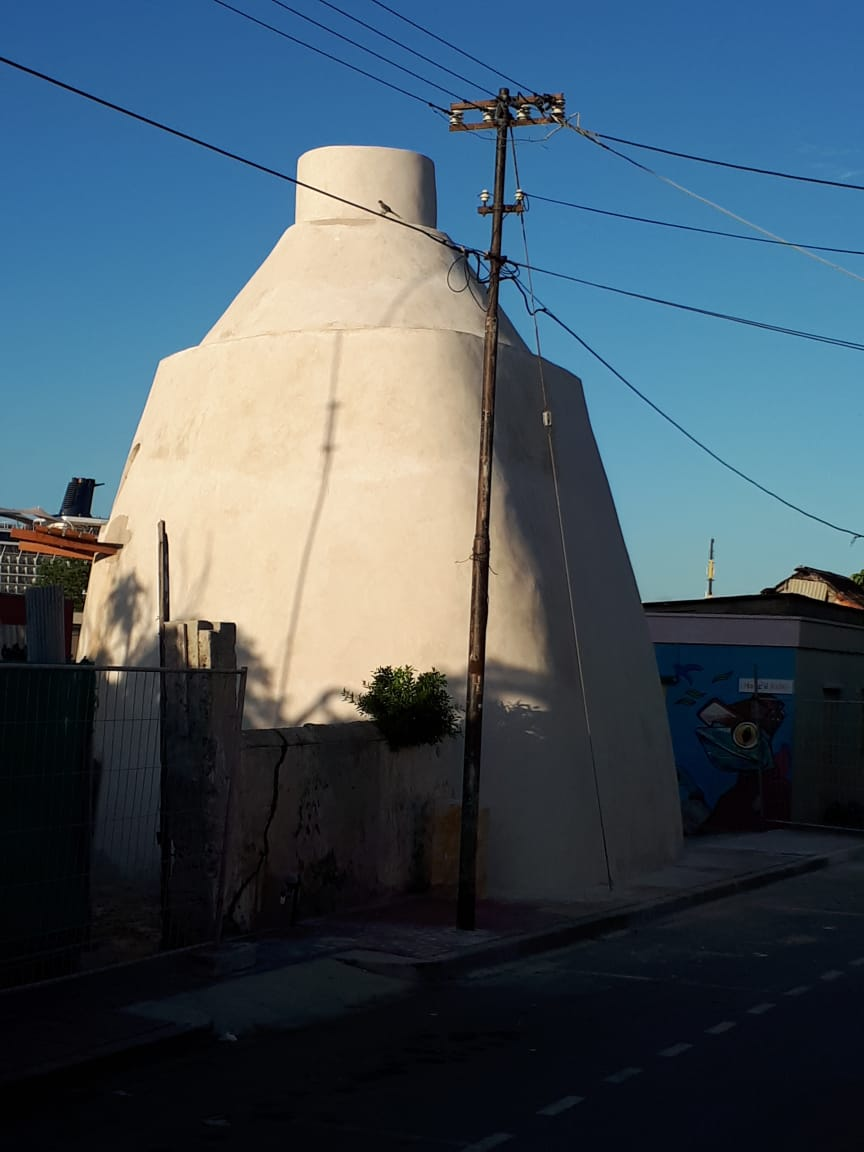
Rancho lime kiln

Rancho is home to the only remaining lime kiln in Aruba, which was constructed in 1892 and operated until 1949. Following its restoration in 1970, it was declared a monument.

In 1905, Hendrik Eman received permission to lay pipes from the water wells in Saliña and Madiki to the harbour of Oranjestad. Any excess water was stored in a water tank in Rancho and sold to the city's residents. In 2020, a program was initiated to preserve the water tank as an early industrial heritage site.

Rancho is also the location of the National Archaeological Museum Aruba, and it serves as a stop for the tram.

== Notable people ==
- Boy Ecury (1922–1944), World War II resistance fighter
- Nydia Ecury (1926–2012), writer and actress
