= Nydia Ecury =

Aruban-Dutch writer, translator and actress

- Born: Nydia Maria Enrica Ecury; 2 February 1926; Rancho, Aruba
- Died: 2 March 2012 (aged 86); Willemstad, Curaçao
- Occupations: Educator, actress, writer
- Years active: 1957-2007
- Known for: Promotion of Papiamentu as a cultural expression

Nydia Ecury (2 February 1926 – 2 March 2012) was an Aruban-Dutch writer, translator and actress. She published five collections of poetry and translated plays of major European and American playwrights into the Papiamentu language, helping to develop the native dialect into a cultural language. The recipient of numerous awards, including the Chapi di Plata literary prize, Ecury was honored as a knight of the Order of Orange-Nassau.

== Early life ==
Nydia Maria Enrica Ecury was born on 2 February 1926 in Oranjestad, Aruba in a fishing village called Rancho in the west area of the capital to Ana Paulina Wilhelmina Ernst and Nicasio Segundo Ecury. Her father was an honorary consul to Haiti and a first-generation freeborn man of African descent. Her mother was an orphan from the main island of the Dutch Caribbean; Curaçao. Boy Ecury, her brother, had joined the Dutch resistance fighters, and was executed by the Germans during World War II; he became Aruba's national hero. In total, they were 13 siblings. The mansion in which the family was raised, a noted example of Dutch colonial architecture now houses Aruba's National Archeological Museum. Though her siblings were educated in the Netherlands, Ecury attended school in Canada, studying English literature and journalism.

== Career ==
Completing her studies, Ecury moved to Curaçao in 1957 and began a career as an English teacher. She taught at Martines Mavo High School and the Nilda Pinto Huishoudschool, while simultaneously giving private lessons in Papiamentu, the most commonly spoken creole language of the Dutch Caribbean. In 1960, Ecury married Wilhelm Eduard Isings, a Dutch businessman. The couple had two children, Caresse Isings Ecury and Wilhelm Alexander Isings, before they divorced in 1964, raising their children as a single mother.

Ecury's interest in promoting Papiamentu led her, after World War II, to act in plays and translate the works of renowned authors into a language with which local audiences could understand. Prior to that time, the Catholic Church and government had restricted use of Papiamentu, as a means of asserting a unified cultural identity. She co-founded a theatrical group, Thalia, in 1967 and was known for adapting plays from English, French and Spanish to imbue them with a Caribbean sensitivity. Some of her most noted translations include Gay bieuw ta traha sòpi stèrki (1968), which was an interpretation of Alfonso Paso's Cosas de mamá y papá; Mentira na granèl (1968), a translation of Carlo Goldoni's Il bugiardo; E Rosa Tatuá (1971), a rendering of Tennessee Williams' The Rose Tattoo; and Romeo i Julieta (1991), based upon Shakespeare's Romeo and Juliet. Performing such plays spurred other native authors to create new works, propagating Papiamento as a language of cultural expression.

Ecury began publishing her own works in 1972 with the publication Tres rosea (Three Breaths), which was co-authored by Sonia Garmers and Mila Palm. It began a pattern for her literary works, which alternated between the use of Dutch, English and Papiamentu. Other noted works she produced included Bos di sanger, Kantika pa mama tera, Na mi kurason mará and Sekura. In 1980, she staged a one-woman show, Luna di Papel (Paper Moon), which combined her poetry with impersonations, stand-up comedy and singing, accompanied by the Salsbach Jazz Trio. After sold-out productions in Willemstad, Ecury took the cabaret show on the road to Aruba, Bonaire, and the Netherlands. It was recorded and has enjoyed a three-decade broadcast history with the media outlets of Curaçao. In addition, she represented the Netherlands Antilles at literary festivals in the Caribbean, Europe, and North and South American more than twenty times.

In the early 1980s, Ecury wrote and translated for school use, stories for children in Papiamentu and held an advisory position to the Department of Education, which continued until 1987. In 1984, she and Jenny Fraai co-wrote, Di A te Z: Ortografia ofisial di Papiamentu(The A to Z: Official Orthography of Papiamentu). Between 1980 and her death, Ecury frequently appeared on radio and television stations and at cultural festivals. She appeared in 1984 before Queen Beatrix performing a recitation of her poetry in four languages. In 1986, she played Mama Grandi in the film Almacita di desolato, under the direction of Felix de Rooy, which would be recognized in 1991 with the FESPACO Paul Robeson Prize.

Her cultural contributions were recognized by the Kingdom of the Netherlands in 1972, when Ecury was awarded the Gold Medal of the Order of Orange-Nassau (Dutch: Ere medaille in Goud). In 1996, Ecury received the Chapi di Plata from the Pierre Lauffer Foundation of Curaçao and in 1999 became a member of the Order of Orange-Nassau. She was promoted to knight in the Order of Nassau in 2002 and in 2007 was awarded the Cola Debrot Prize, the most prestigious award for cultural contributions of the Dutch Caribbean.

== Death and legacy ==
Ecury died on 2 March 2012 in Willemstad, after a five-year struggle with Alzheimer's disease. In October 2013, a compilation of her works written in Papiamentu and translated by Ecury into Dutch, Een droom die ik heb was published by Knipscheer Press. Wim Statius Muller's waltz "Nydia" was written in her honor.
