= A. J. van Koolwijk =

Antonius Johannes van Koolwijk OP RNL OOL
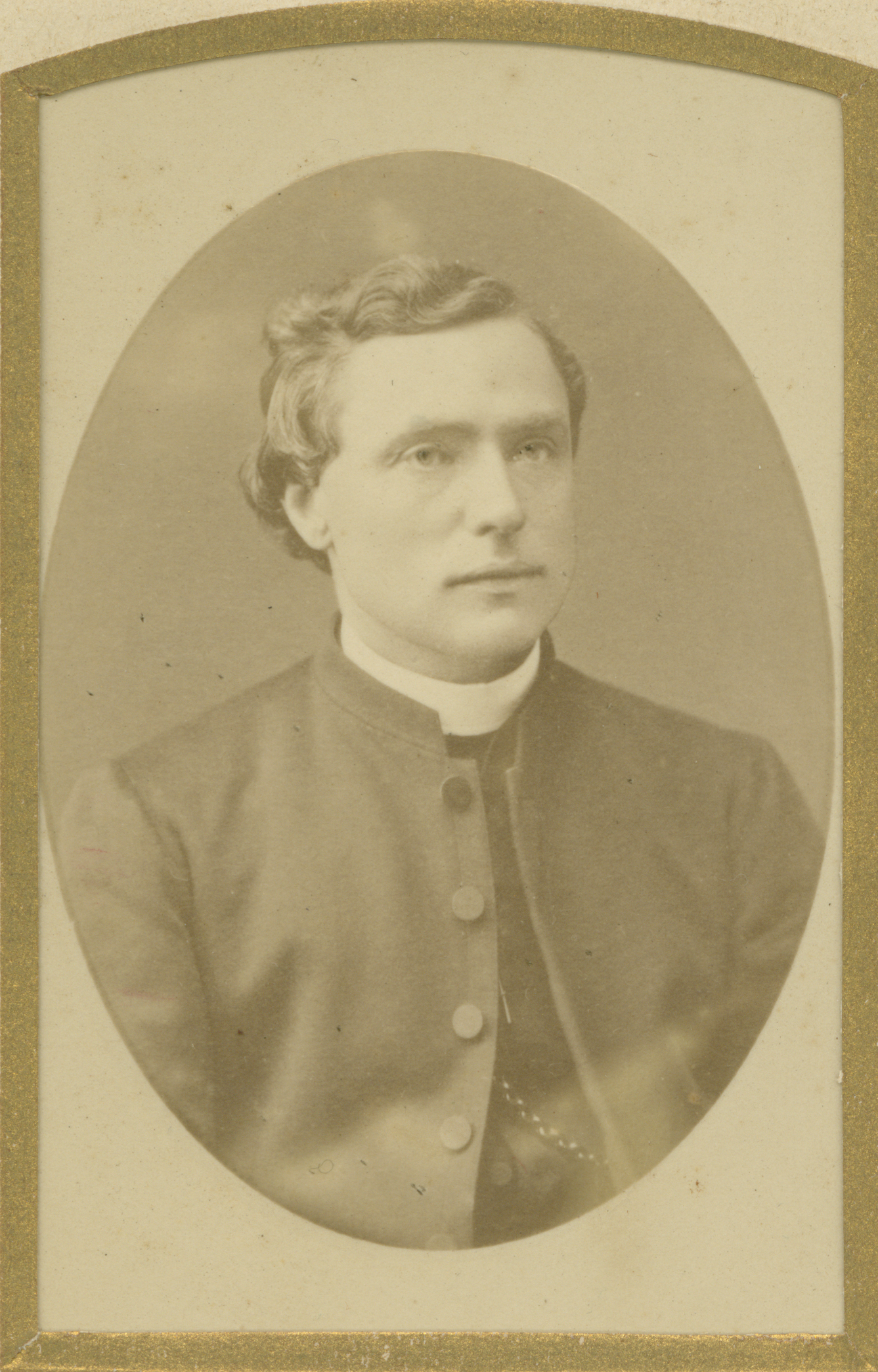
- A. J. van Koolwijk (1870-1890)

Personal life
- Born: 9 October 1836 Winssen
- Died: 14 November 1913 (aged 77) Hees
- Parent(s): Hendrik van Koolwijk; Maria van Welie
- Known for: Archeological research in Aruba, Curaçao and Bonaire; Portrait Photography
- Occupation: Archeologist; Ethnologist

Religious life
- Religion: Catholic
- Order: Dominican Order
- Profession: Pastor in Oranjestad (1880–1886)

Antonius Johannes van Koolwijk OP (Winssen, 9 October 1836 – Hees, 1913) was a Dutch clergyman of the Roman Catholic Church. His notable contributions lie in the field of archeological research, particularly his studies on the indigenous culture of Aruba, Bonaire, and Curaçao during the late 19th century. Van Koolwijk is recognized as the pioneering archeologist of the ABC islands.

== Biography ==
Van Koolwijk was born in Winssen and was one of ten children of Maria van Welie and Hendrik van Koolwijk. His father had previously served as steward at Slot Doddendael, as well as a former mayor of Ewijk and Winssen, and a former member of the Provincial States of Gelderland. Initially starting his priestly career as a Redemptorist, Van Koolwijk later left the order and, in 1869, traveled to Suriname, where he worked as an unpaid priest. From 1870 onward, he served in Curaçao, first as a chaplain in the parish of Santa Rosa and later in Otrobanda. In 1873, he became the pastor of the St. Louis Bertrand Church in Rincon, Bonaire. Returning to Curaçao in 1878, he took charge of the Westpunt Parish. In 1880, he became the pastor of the St. Franciscus Church in Oranjestad, Aruba. Due to liver disease, Van Koolwijk returned to the Netherlands in 1886 and requested retirement in 1888. He died at the age of 77 in Hees and was buried in the cemetery of the Roman Catholic Church in Winssen.

== Archaeological work ==
Van Koolwijk had no formal education in archaeology, but he showed great passion as an observer and fieldworker. His fascination with Amerindian history led him to conduct the initial archaeological explorations on Aruba, Bonaire, and Curaçao, making him the pioneering archaeologist of the Dutch Caribbean. In recognition of this accomplishment, he was appointed as a knight in the Order of the Dutch Lion in 1887.

In 1875, Van Koolwijk created sketches of the rock paintings found in the Onima Caves near Rincon. These sketches marked the first recorded documentation of the prehistoric rock paintings in Bonaire. Alongside caves, rock drawings can also be seen on the ceilings of wave-cut platforms and on the shaded side of diorite blocks in Bonaire. In 1907, Paul Euwens published these sketches, referring to them as 'hieroglyphs'. Van Koolwijk also conducted research on pictograms in Curaçao and Aruba. During his time in Curaçao, he discovered various prehistoric settlements on the island, including the village of Ascension. His most significant find was the village of San Juan, situated on the western coastal terrace of Knip in Bandabou. Additionally, Van Koolwijk amassed an extensive collection of shells and crustaceans, carefully documenting their precise locations.

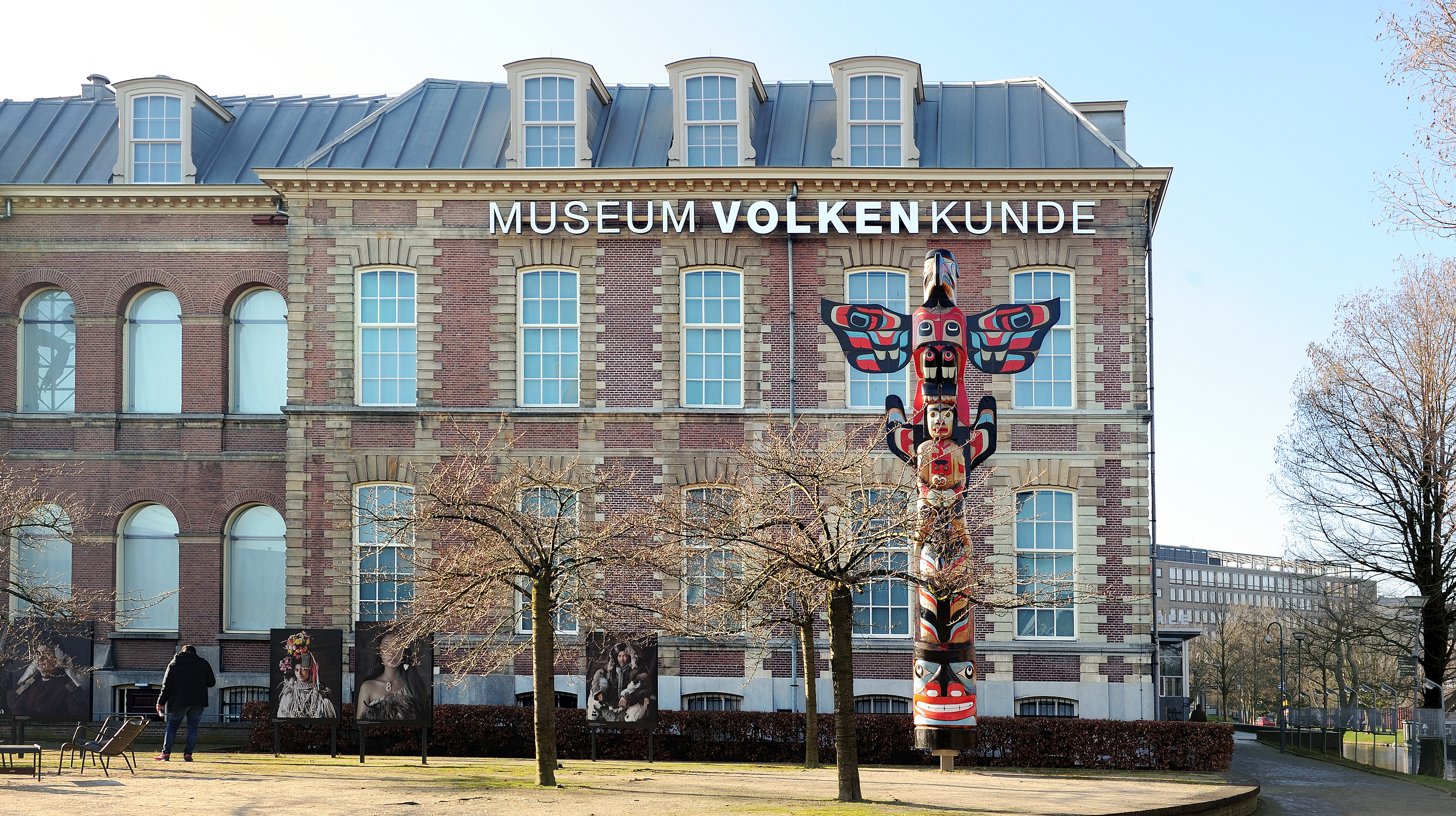
National Museum of Ethnology (formerly the Rijks Ethnographisch Museum) in Leiden

On the island of Aruba, Van Koolwijk conducted research at the Indian camp located in Santa Cruz. He also explored other sites in Fontein, Savaneta, Tanki Flip, and Arikok. During his investigations, he collected materials found on the surface and conducted small excavations to study remnants from the pre-Columbian era. The discoveries included pottery shards, stone tools, human skulls, and large burial urns containing bodies in a crouched position. These findings provided evidence that the Carib people had also inhabited Aruba prior to the Arawaks, who were the inhabitants when the Spanish explorers discovered the island. In 1923, the excavations in Santa Cruz and San Juan were continued by Jan Petrus Benjamin de Josselin de Jong, an anthropologist and curator at the Rijks Ethnographisch Museum.

=== Collection Van Koolwijk ===
During the years 1883, 1885, 1886, and 1887, Van Koolwijk generously donated the data and materials he had gathered to the Rijks Ethnographisch Museum in Leiden. These valuable contributions are now recognized as the Van Koolwijk Collection.

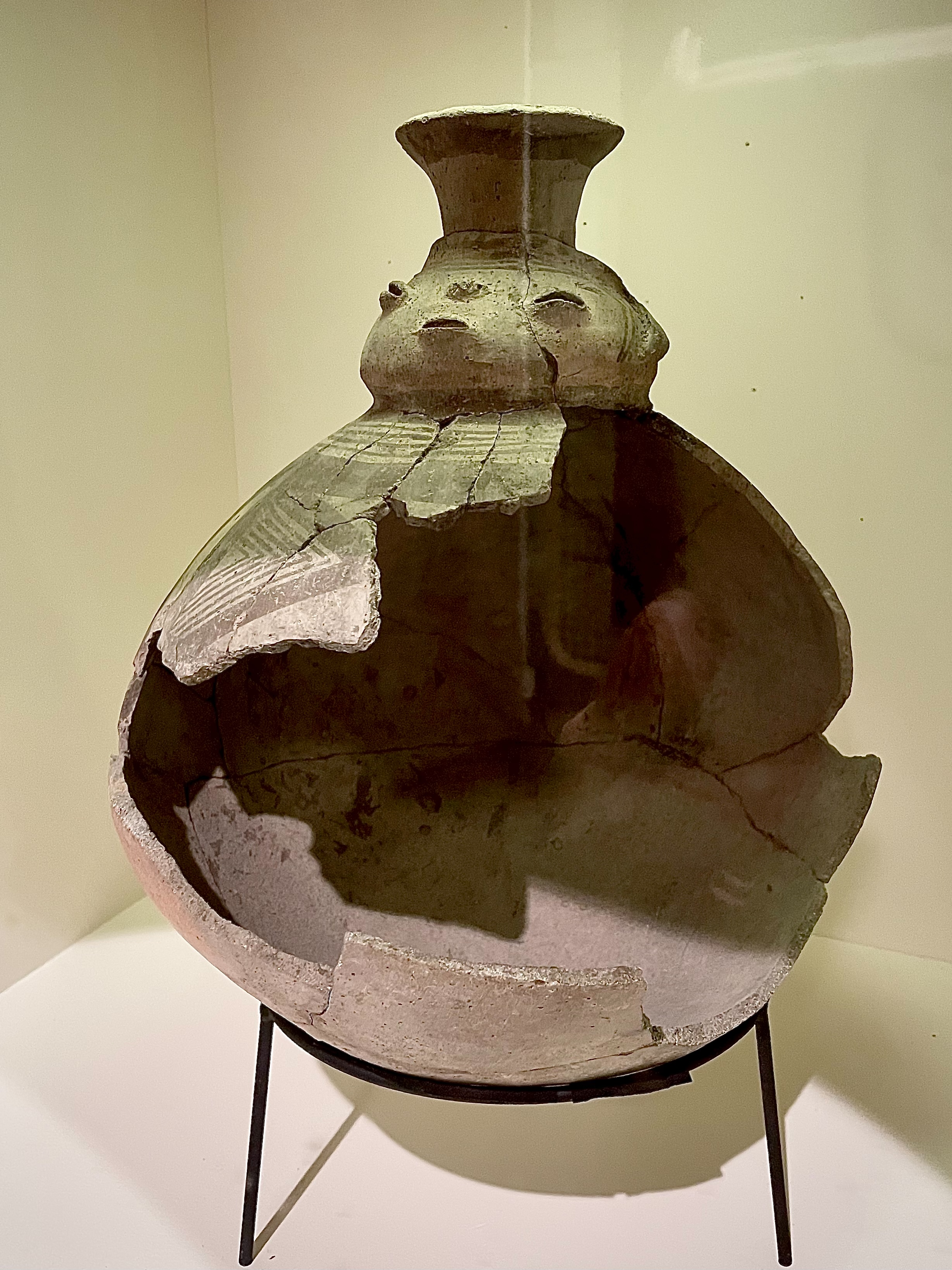
Dabajuroid ceramic (Van Koolwijk Collection)

In 1885, more than 120 ethnographic objects were generously donated, and a detailed list of these items was published in the Nederlandsche Staatscourant on September 16, 1885. Since the National Archaeological Museum Aruba opened its doors in 2009, five remarkable artifacts have been loaned to the museum, including three exceptional pieces—a beautifully adorned calabash, a ceramic face jug, and a ceramic figurine. Additionally, Van Koolwijk's contributions can be found in various other institutions, such as the Het Koninklijk Penningkabinet (numismatic museum), the Rijksmuseum van Natuurlijke Historie (National Museum of Natural History), the National Museum of Geology and Mineralogy, the Dutch Museum of History and Art, and the Hortus Botanicus Leiden.

== Photography ==
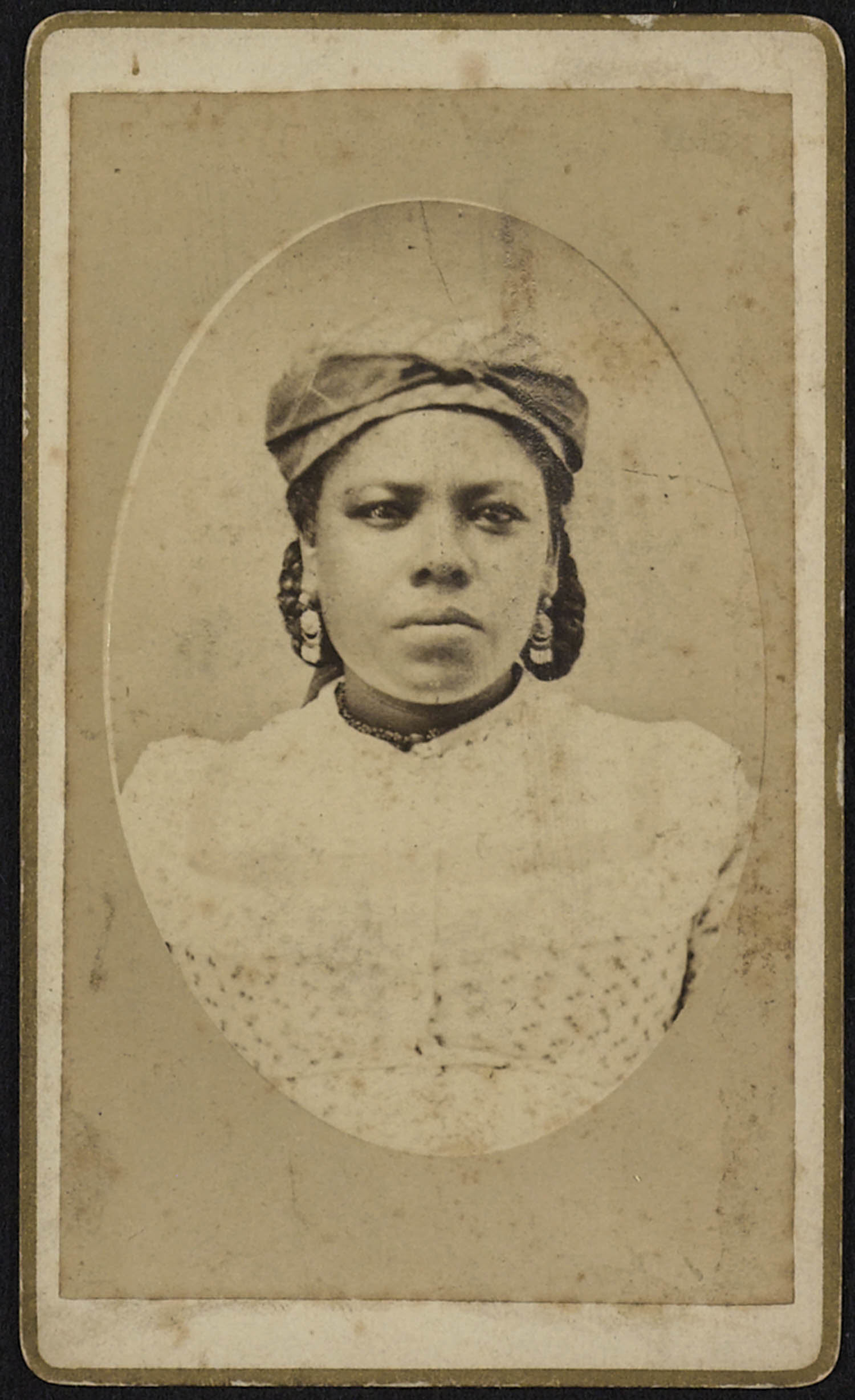
Young girl from the common class (1884–1885, Bonaire)

Driven by a profound fascination for the people of Aruba, Van Koolwijk embarked on a photographic venture in 1887, capturing a captivating series of portrait photographs. Distinguishing himself from Soublette et Fils, his lens focused exclusively on individuals with darker skin tones.

== Additional work ==
Van Koolwijk was a prolific writer, focusing primarily on Aruba and its history. He authored various publications, including a concise glossary of the language spoken by the island's indigenous people. Additionally, he conducted research and collected specimens of native animals, plants, and their related products. In 1883, he participated in the International Colonial and Export Exhibition in Amsterdam, where he presented Aruban oils, fats, resins, and gums, such as calabash oil (Crescentia cujete), iguana fat (Iguana delicatissima), hermit crab fat (Pagurus bernhardus), aloe resin (Aloe vera), wayaka resin (Guaiacum officinale), and cashew gum (Anacardium occidentale). His exhibition garnered awards in two categories. Two species of barrel cacti, endemic to Aruba and described by Jan Valckenier Suringar, were named after him: Melocactus koolwijkianus and Melocactus curvispinus subsp. koolwijkianus. Van Koolwijk actively contributed as a member of the Dutch Trade Museum and held the distinction of being an honorary member of the Dutch Society for the Advancement of Industry. In 1897, he received the honorary membership of the "Geschied-, Taal-, Land- en Volkenkundig Genootschap" or "Historical, Linguistic, Territorial, and Ethnological Society", located in Willemstad, Curaçao.

== Distinctions ==
- Netherlands: Knight in the Order of the Netherlands Lion (1887)
- Venezuela: Officer in the Order of the Liberator

== Published works ==
- Geschiedkundige beschrijving van het Huis Doddendaal te Ewijk
  (Historical Description of Doddendaal House in Ewijk) (1900)
- Indiaansche opschriften voorkomende op het eiland Aruba en zoo getrouw mogelijk naar het oorspronkelijke geteekend
  (Indigenous Inscriptions Found on the Island of Aruba and Drawn as Faithfully as Possible to the Original)
- De Indianen-Carai͏̈ben, oorspronkelijke bewoners van Curaçao
  (The Indian-Carai͏̈ben, Original Inhabitants of Curaçao) (1881)
- De Indianen Carai͏̈ben van het eiland Aruba (West-Indie͏̈)
  (The Indian-Carai͏̈ben of the Island of Aruba (West Indies)) (1882)
- Figuren, behoorende bij het artikel over de Indianen-Caraïben
  (Figures, Accompanying the Article on the Indian-Caraïben) (1882)
- Bijdrage tot de taal der oude Indianen
  (Contribution to the Language of the Ancient Indians) (1884)
- Berichten uit Aruba
  (Reports from Aruba) (1884)
- Parelvisscherij op Aruba
  (Pearl Fishing on Aruba) (1884)
- De Aruba-Phosphaat-Maatschappij
  (The Aruba Phosphate Company) (1884)
- Het goudland Aruba
  (The Gold Land Aruba) (1884)
- Bronnen van mineraalwater op Aruba
  (Sources of Mineral Water on Aruba) (1884)

== Sources ==
- "Familie van Koolwijk" [Family of Koolwijk]. Huis van de Nijmeegse geschiedenis (in Dutch).
- "Obituary". Amigoe di Curacao: weekblad voor de Curacaosche eilanden (in Dutch) (Day ed.). Willemstad: Nv paulus drukkerij. 1885-05-30. p. 4.
- "Kerknieuws em missionaris A.J. van Koolwijk" [Church news retired missionary A.J. van Koolwijk]. De Maasbode (in Dutch). Rotterdam. 1913-11-20.
- "Over Oudheden uit Ned. West-Indie en Suriname door Dr. J. D. E. SCHMELTZ" [About Antiquities from the Dutch West Indies and Suriname by Dr. J. D. E. SCHMELTZ.]. Amigoe di Curacao: weekblad voor de Curacaosche eilanden (in Dutch). Willemstad: Nv paulus drukkerij. 1905-01-28.
- BV, DE REE Archiefsystemen. "Geboorte Antonius Johannes van Koolwijk, 09-10-1836". www.geldersarchief.nl (in Dutch).
- "BINNENLAND". De Maasbode. 1885-08-21.
- "VOOR 50 JAAR". Amigoe di Curacao : weekblad voor de Curacaosche eilanden. 1937-12-11.
