= Public holidays in Aruba =

The national holidays in Aruba are:

Date	English name	Dutch name	Papiamento name	Notes
1 January	New Year's Day	Nieuwjaarsdag	Aña Nobo	About special Aruban tradition related to the New Year's Eve, pagara and Dande.
25 January	Betico Croes Day	Dag van Betico Croes	Dia di Betico Croes	Arubans commemorates the birthday of the late Aruban political leader, Gilberto François ("Betico") Croes, called the Father of the Aruban People and Libertador (lit. Liberator). He helped Aruba attain the "Status Aparte", giving Aruba autonomy from the Netherlands Antilles and eventually allowing it to function as a commonwealth within the Kingdom of the Netherlands.
February or March	Carnival Monday	Carnaval Maandag	Dialuna Carnaval	Carnival Monday always takes place after the weekend of the grand Carnival parades and it is the Monday before Ash Wednesday. 2024: February 12. It is an official day of rest, so that everyone can recoup and recover from all the parades and festivities that took place in the previous two months or so.
March 18	National Anthem and Flag Day	Dag van het Volkslied en de Vlag	Dia di Himno y Bandera	The national Flag of Aruba, along with the official anthem "Aruba Dushi Tera", was adopted on 18 March 1976. The celebration commemorates the Kingdom of the Netherlands giving Aruba an autonomous status (Status Aparte).
March or April	Good Friday	Goede Vrijdag	Bierna Santo	Friday before Easter. 2024: March 29
March or April	Easter Monday	Tweede Paasedag	Dialuna Pasco	This is a two-day holiday, called Eerste Paasdag (lit.: First Easter Day) on Sunday and Tweede Paasdag (lit.: Second Easter Day) on Monday. 2024: March 31 - April 1.
27 April	King's Day	Koningsdag	Dia di Rey	This is the celebration of the birthday of King Willem-Alexander of the Kingdom of the Netherlands. If April 27 falls on a Sunday, King's Day is celebrated on the 26th.
May 1	Labour Day	Dag van de Arbeid	Dia di Labor	Contrary to the European part of the Kingdom of the Netherlands, where no Labor Day is celebrated at all (even not at a different date), Arubans celebrate it on the 1st of May, like most countries of the world.
40 days after Easter	Ascension Day	Hemelvaartsdag	Dia di Ascension	2024: May 9
25–26 December	Christmas Day	Kerstmis	Pasco di Nacemento (Pasco)	Two days of Christmas are celebrated, called Eerste Kerstdag (lit. First Christmas Day) and Tweede Kerstdag (lit. Second Christmas Day)

== Other celebrations in Aruba ==
These celebrations are not official holidays, but they are still part of the cultural celebrations in Aruba.

- Semana Santa - the week leading up to the Easter holidays - It is a tradition for entire Aruban families to enjoy a few days vacation away from home camping on the beaches around the island.
- Dera Gay (The Burying of the Rooster) - June 24th each year - On the Feast of St. John the Baptist (in Papiamento: Dia di San Juan) people thank the Gods for the good harvest year and request them to bless the harvests for the following year. This is a non-Christian tradition, related to African diaspora religions.
- Aruba's Carnival Schedule Day - November 11th each year - At 11:11 AM on the 11th of the 11th month, the Carnival Schedule for the upcoming season is officially announced. The preparations period lasts till December 31st, and the contests, parties and parades start with the Torch Parade on the first Saturday in January. The final parades take place in the weekend before Ash Wednesday (Dutch: Aswoensdag).
- Sinterklaas (Sint Nicolas or Santa Claus's Eve) - December 5th each year - Saint Nicolas arrives with his "Zwarte Pieten" (helpers) via boat, supposedly from Spain, to the Harbor of Oranjestad, on the first Saturday after November 11, i.e. a few weeks before his birthday and name day. On his arrival he greets all children of Aruba and rewards them with gifts and candy for their good behavior. On December 5th, on his birthday, Saint Nicolas treats all children with presents that get delivered to their house. (While the birthday and nameday of Saint Nicolas is really on December 6, it is the Saint Nicolas's Eve which is the focus of the celebration).
- Halloween
- Kingdom Day - December 15th each year - Kingdom's Day is the celebration of the signing of the Charter for the Kingdom of the Netherlands on 15 December 1954, which marked the ending of the colonial era in the Kingdom of the Netherlands. December 15 is an official day to raise the flag at all public buildings throughout the kingdom.

== See also ==
- Carnival in the Netherlands
