= Scuderia =

Scuderia means stable (noun) in the Italian language. It has entered English usage mainly through professional auto racing, in which many Italian teams incorporate the term in their names.

"Scuderia" may refer to:

- Scuderia Ferrari, a current Italian Formula One team
- Any of a number of other racing teams:
  - Scuderia AlphaTauri
  - Scuderia Ambrosiana
  - Scuderia Bizzarrini
  - Scuderia Centro Sud
  - Scuderia Coloni
  - Scuderia Colonia
  - Scuderia Corsa
  - Scuderia Enrico Plate
  - Scuderia Filipinetti
  - Scuderia Finotto
  - Scuderia Italia
  - Scuderia Lavaggi
  - Scuderia Milano
  - Scuderia Playteam
  - Scuderia Serenissima
  - Scuderia Toro Rosso
  - Scuderia Vittoria
  - Scuderia Volpini
- A version of the Ferrari F430
- Scuderia, a streamliner dragster
- Scuderia Cameron Glickenhaus SCG 003, an American sportscar

== See also ==
- Ecurie (disambiguation), French equivalent word
