= Willem Frederik Reinier Suringar =

Dutch botanist

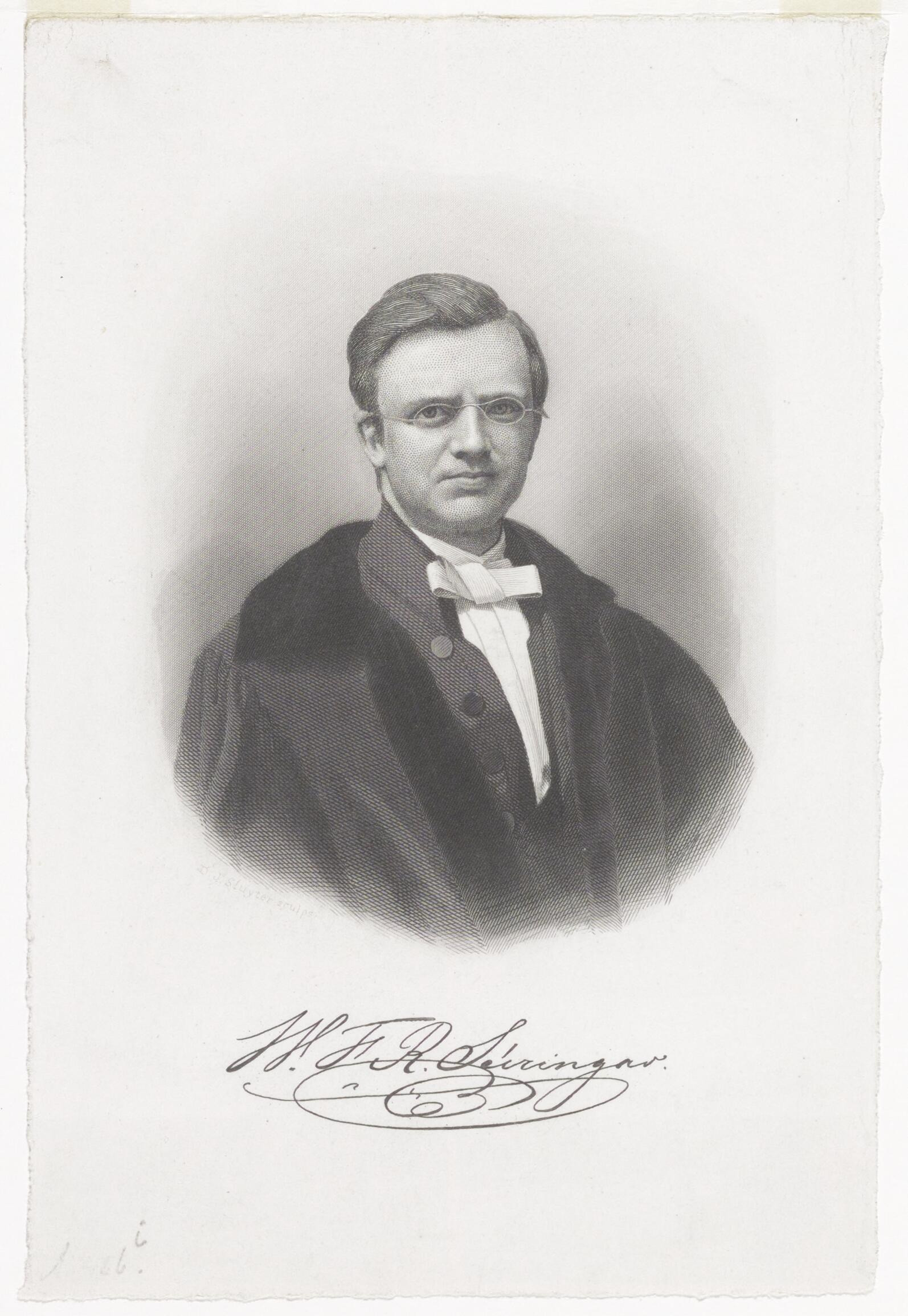
Willem Frederik Reinier Suringar (1868)

Willem Frederik Reinier Suringar (28 December 1832, Leeuwarden – 12 July 1898, Leiden) was a Dutch botanist. His son, Jan Valckenier Suringar (1864–1932), was also a botanist.

In 1857 he obtained his PhD from the University of Leiden, where afterwards he served as an associate professor of botany (1857–1862). In 1862 he succeeded Willem Hendrik de Vriese as a full professor of botany at Leiden, a position he maintained until his death in 1898. From 1871 to 1898 he was director of the Rijksherbarium, being the successor of Friedrich Anton Wilhelm Miquel.

In 1884–85 he took part in a scientific expedition to Suriname, British Guiana, Trinidad and the Netherlands Antilles. As a taxonomist he circumscribed numerous species within the genus Melocactus. In 1886 Jean Baptiste Louis Pierre named the genus Suringaria (family Myrtaceae) in his honor.

== Selected works ==
- Observationes phycologicae in floram batavam, 1857.
- Algae japonicae Musei botanici lugduno-batavi, 1870.
- Musée botanique de Leide, 1871–1897 (3 volumes; with Melchior Treub and Jan Valckenier Suringar).
- Zakflora : handleiding tot het bepalen van de in Nederland wildgroeiende planten, in aansluiting met de werken der Nederlandsche Botanische Vereeniging, 1876.
- Vierde bijdrage tot de kennis der Melocacti, 1896.
