= Ecurie =

Ecurie may refer to:

- Écurie, a commune in the Pas-de-Calais département in France
- Several car racing teams (compare scuderias) :
  - Ecurie Belge
  - Ecurie Bleue
  - Ecurie Bonnier
  - Ecurie Ecosse, a former motor racing team from Scotland
  - Ecurie Espadon
  - Ecurie Francorchamps
  - Ecurie Lutetia
  - Ecurie Maarsbergen
  - Ecurie Nationale Belge
  - Ecurie Rosier

ECURIE may refer to:

- European Community Urgent Radiological Information Exchange, the European early notification system in the event of a radiological or nuclear emergency.

== See also ==
- Ecury (disambiguation)
- Scuderia (disambiguation)
