= Order of the Liberator =

Former national award of Venezuela

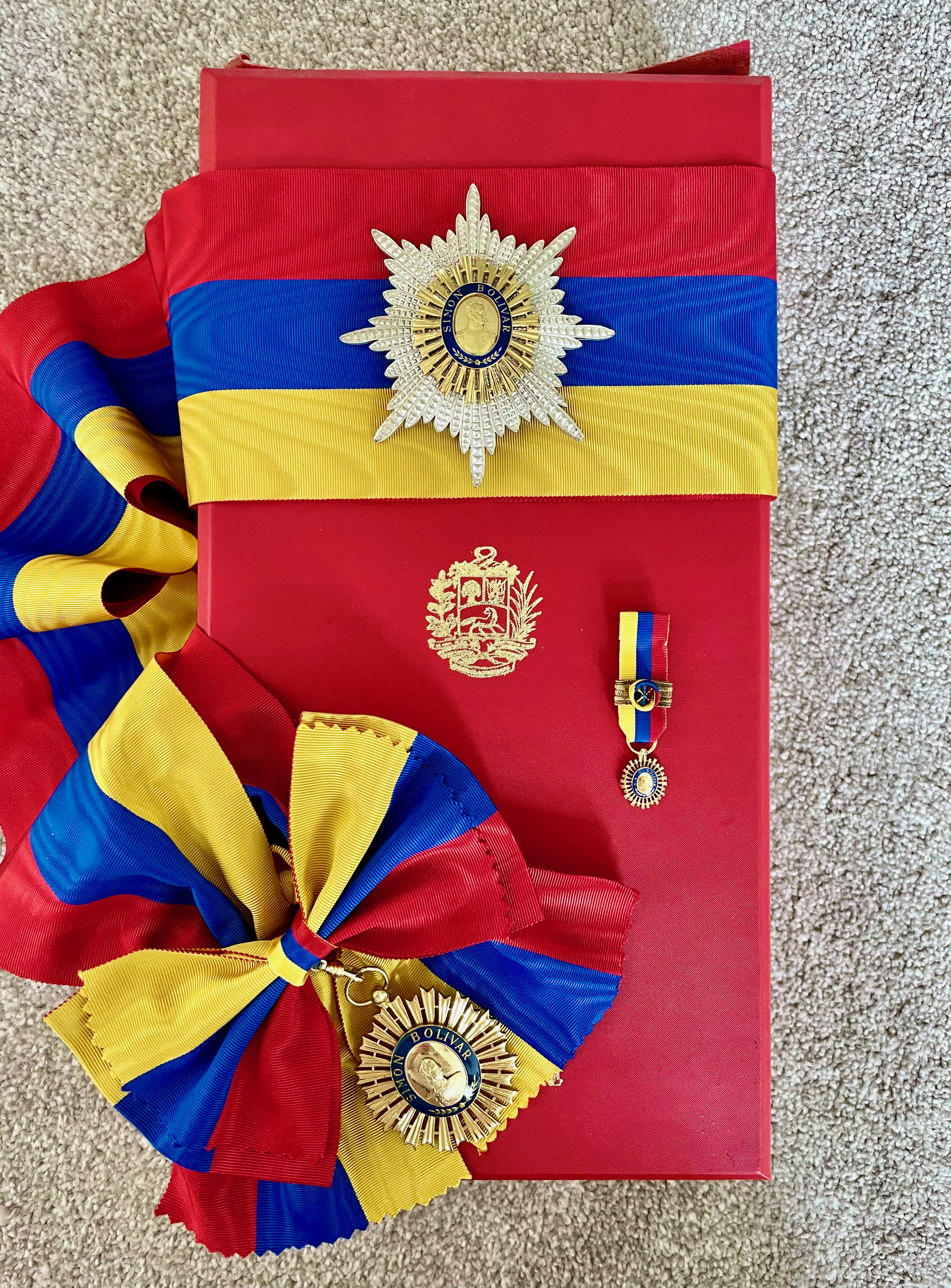
- Grand Cross of the Order of the Liberator Simón Bolívar

Awarded by the Bolivarian Republic of Venezuela
- Type: Order
- Country: Venezuela
- Status: Awarded until 2010
- Grades: Grand Collar; Grand Cordon; Grand Officer; Commander; Officer; Knight
- Ribbon bar of the Order of the Liberator

The Order of the Liberator was the highest distinction of Venezuela and was appointed for services to the country, outstanding merit and benefits made to the community. For Venezuelans the order ranks first in the order of precedence from other orders, national and foreign.

The President of Venezuela is the Chief of the Order and has the faculty of appointing. By right, he wears the Collar of the Order.

The order was created by Antonio Guzmán Blanco on September 14, 1880, and reformed in 1922 under the presidential term of Juan Vicente Gómez, the Order has as precedent the Medal of Distinction with the bust of the Liberator created on March 11, 1854 under the presidency of José Gregorio Monagas and before that, the Order of the Liberators created by Simón Bolívar in 1813.

In 2010, the National Assembly of Venezuela decided to officially abolish the order and replace it with the Order of the Liberators of Venezuela.

== Grades ==
- Collar
- First Class (Grand Cordon)
- Second Class (Grand Officer)
- Third Class (Commander)
- Fourth Class (Officer)
- Fifth Class (Knight)

Ribbon bars of the Order of the Liberator
Knight	Officer	Commander	Grand Officer	Grand Cordon	Collar

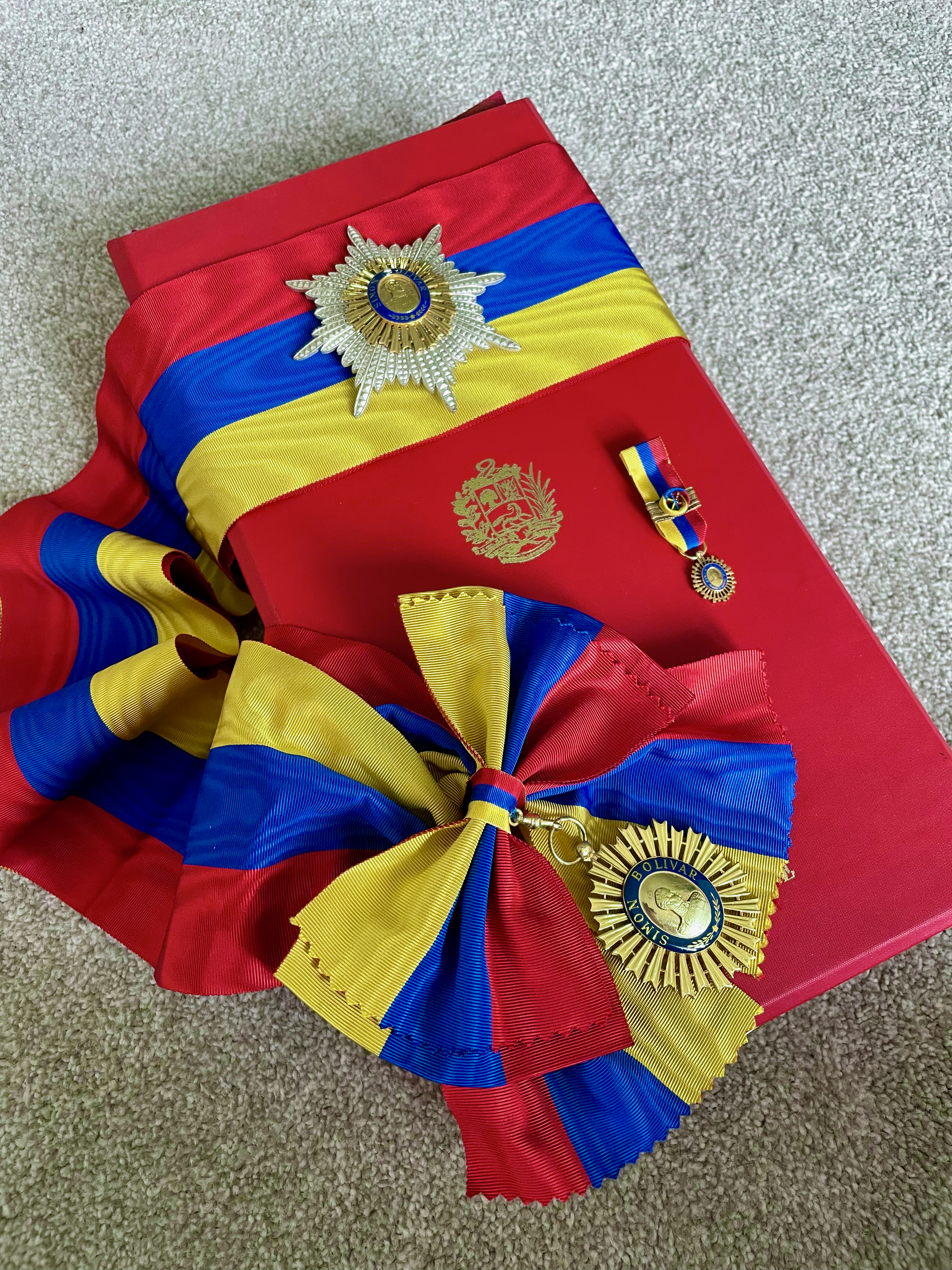
Grand Cross set of the Order.

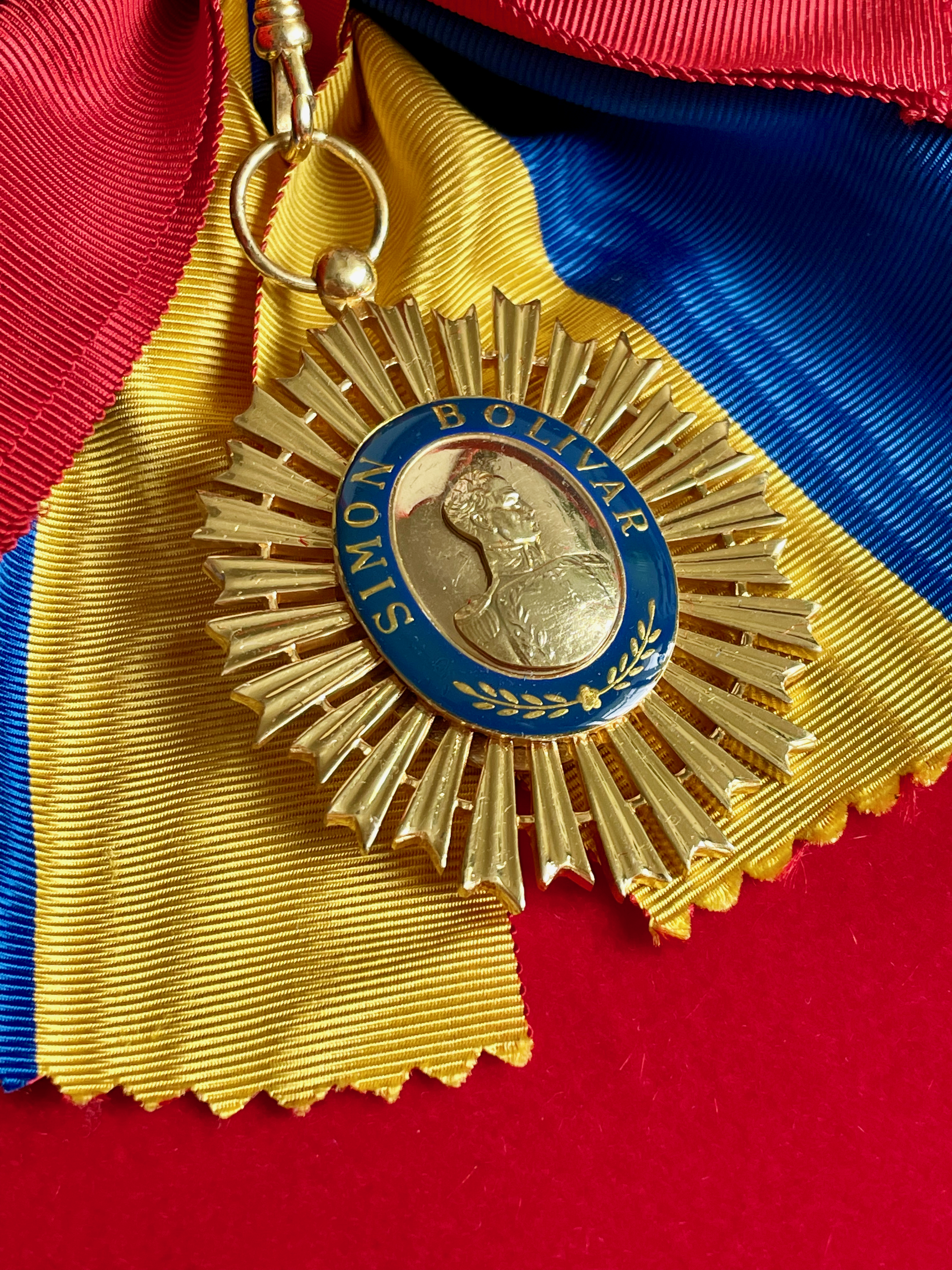
Grand Cross badge (obverse).

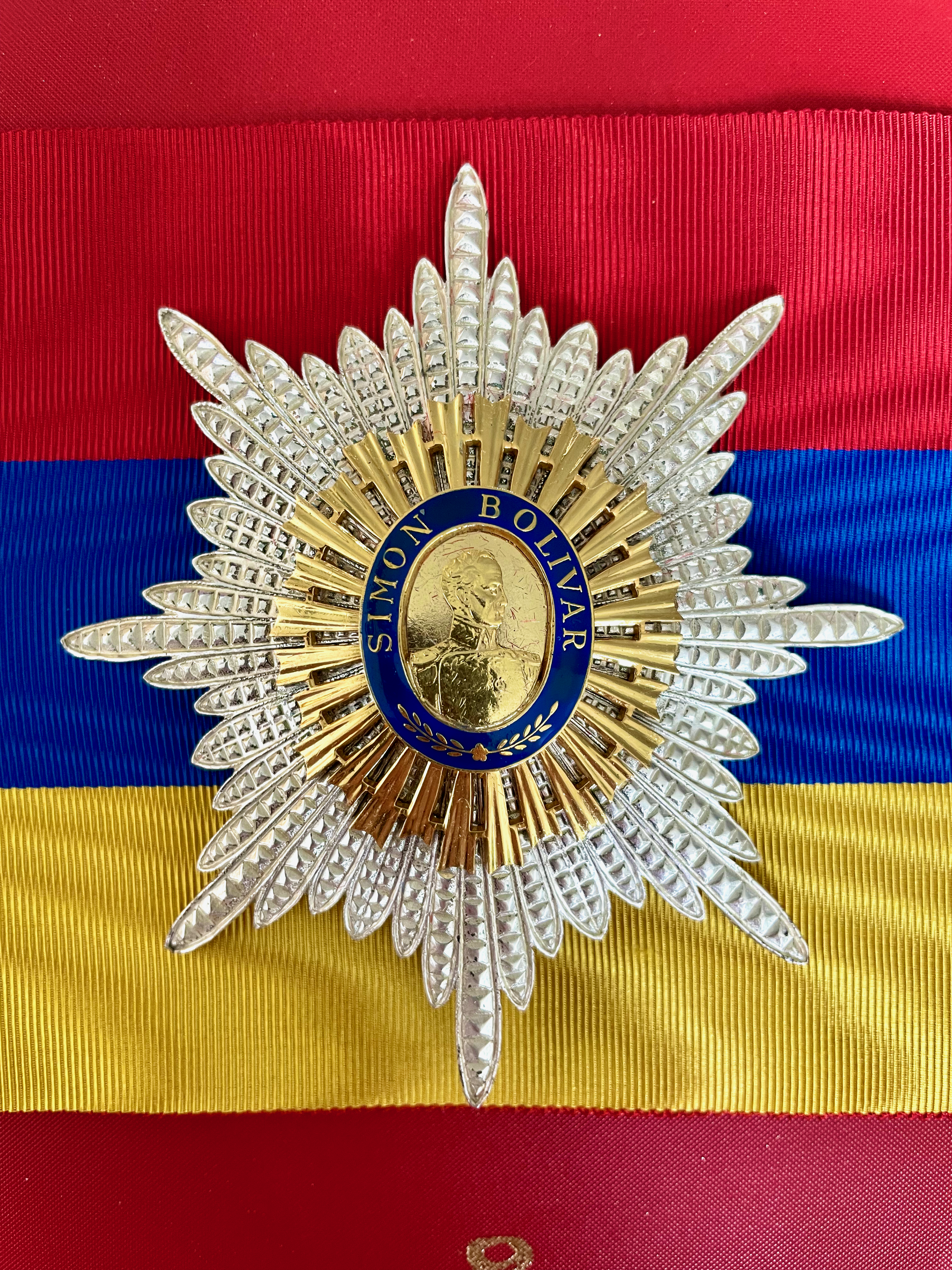
Grand Cross star.

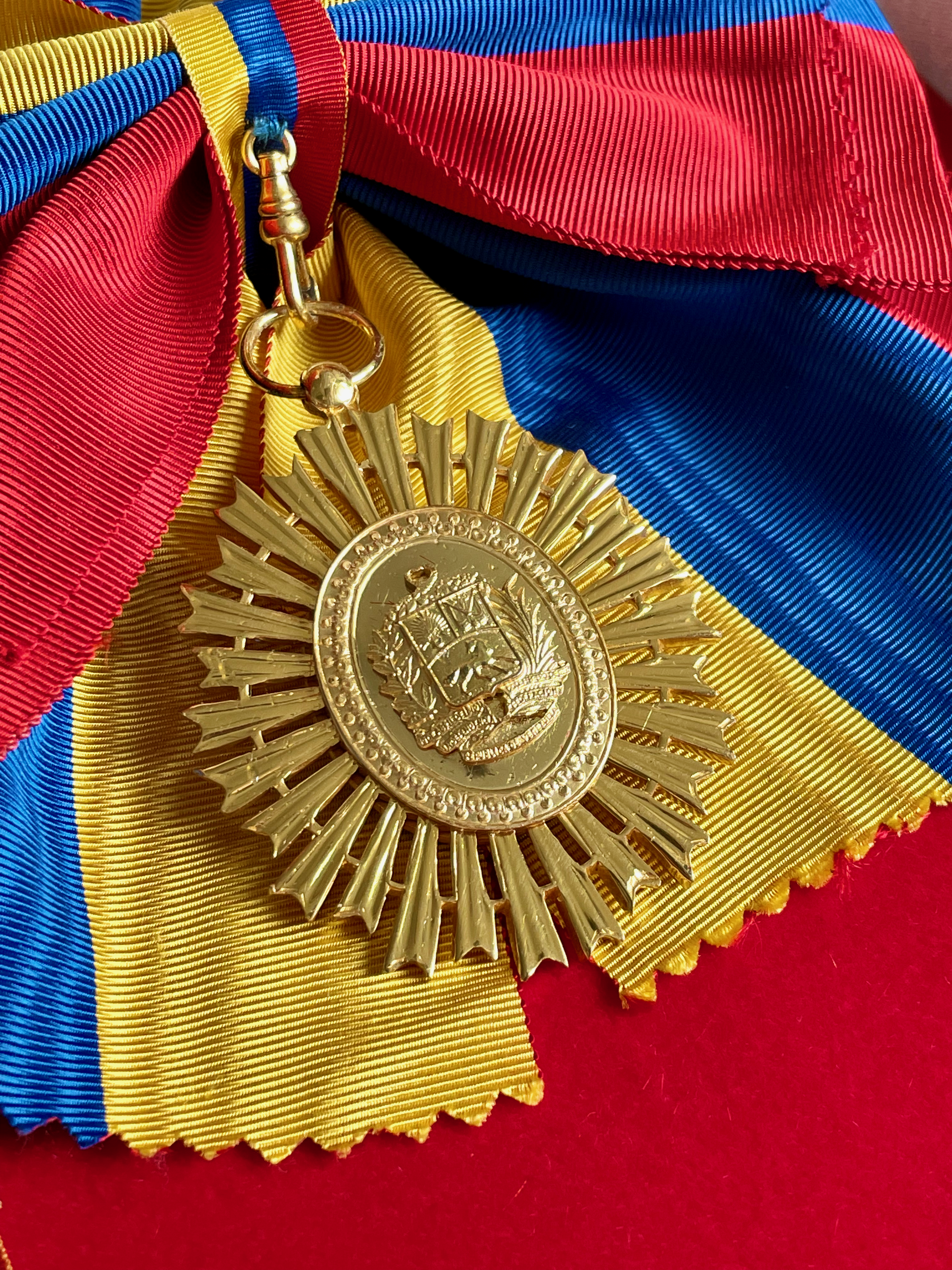
Grand Cross badge (reverse).

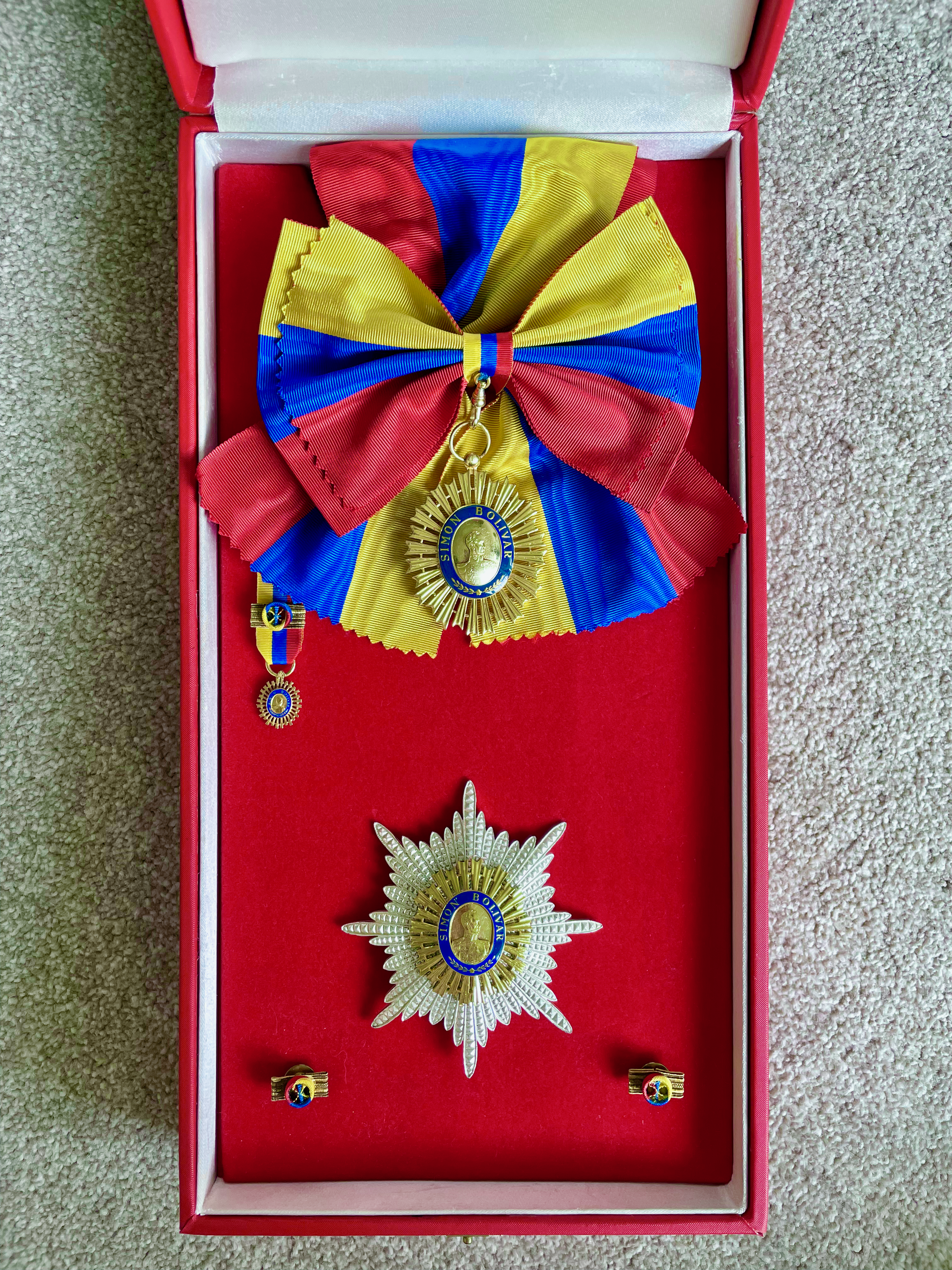
Grand Cross of the Order.
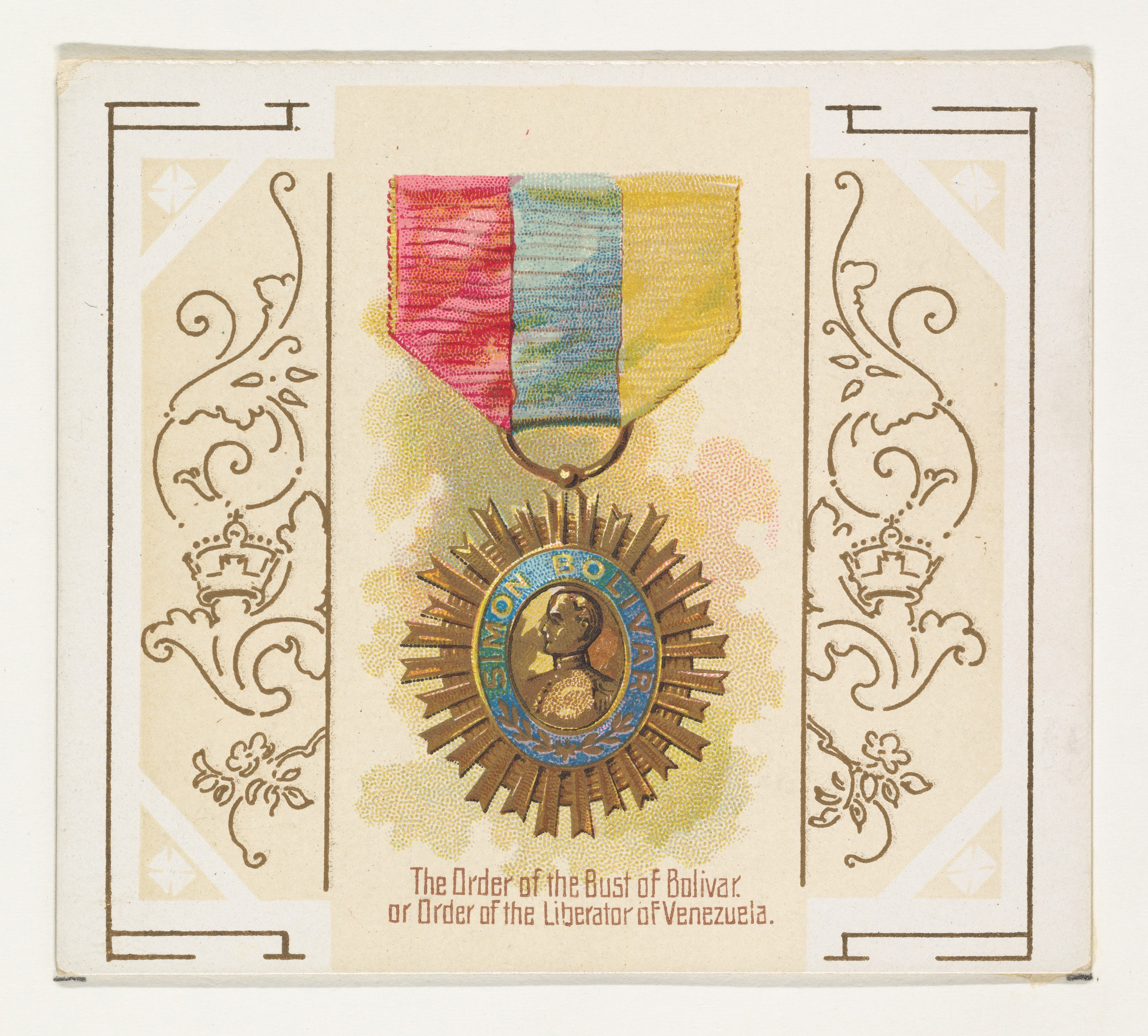
Illustration of the Knights Class.

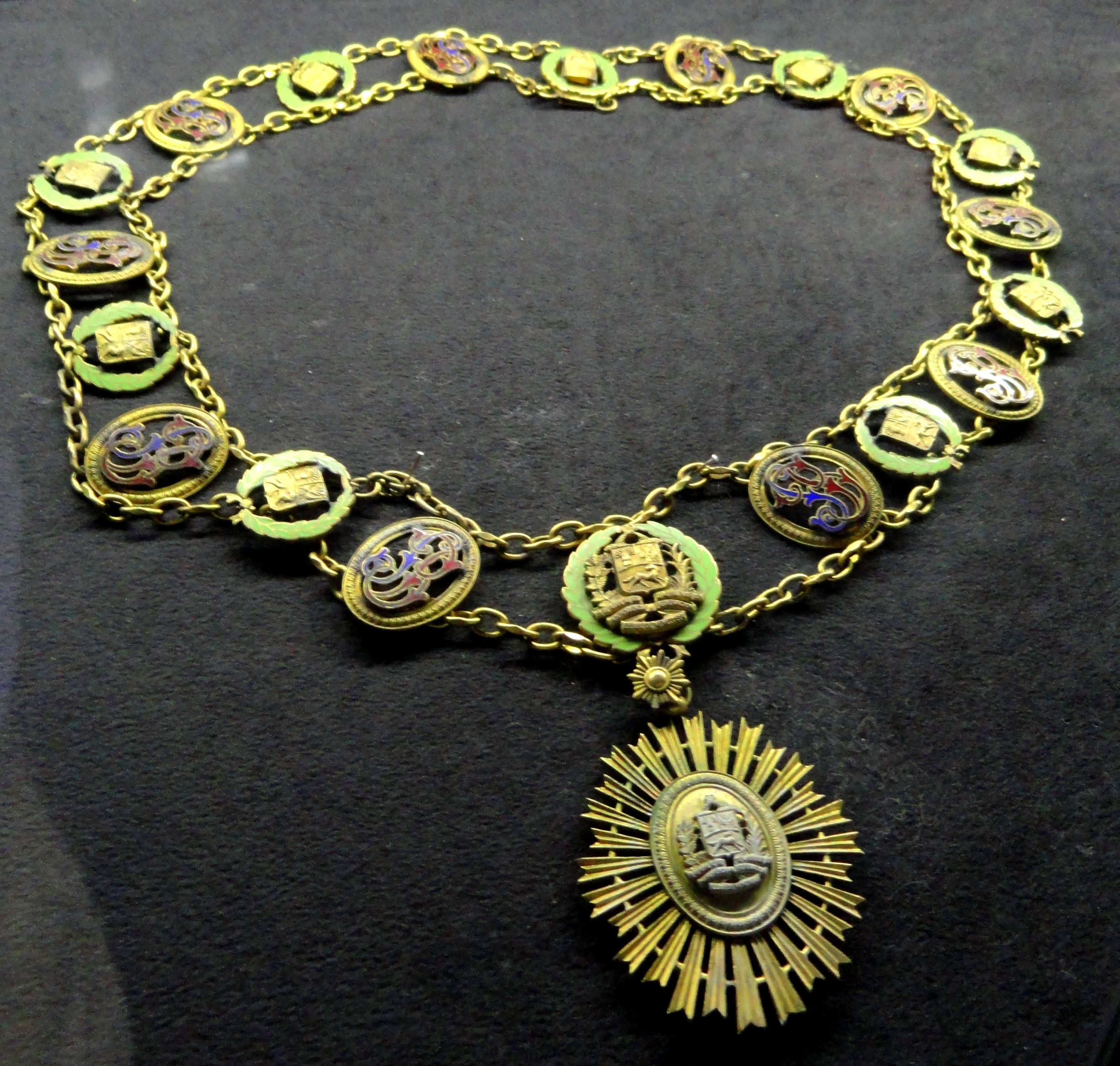
Grand Collar of the Order.

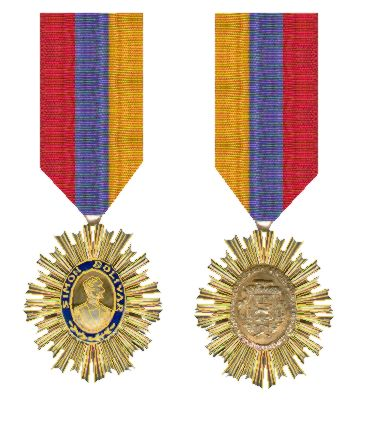
Knights Cross of the Order.

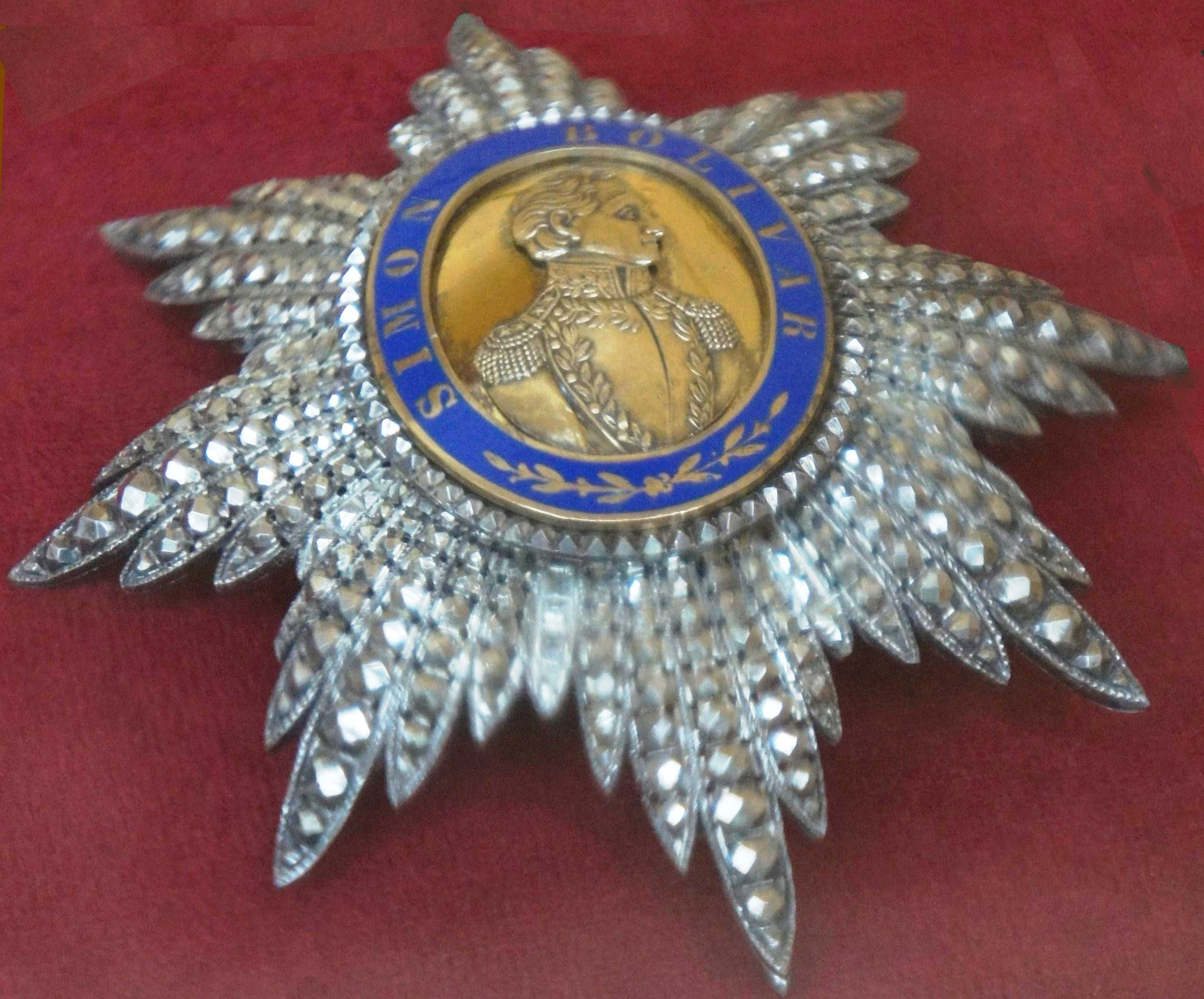
Grand Cross breast star.

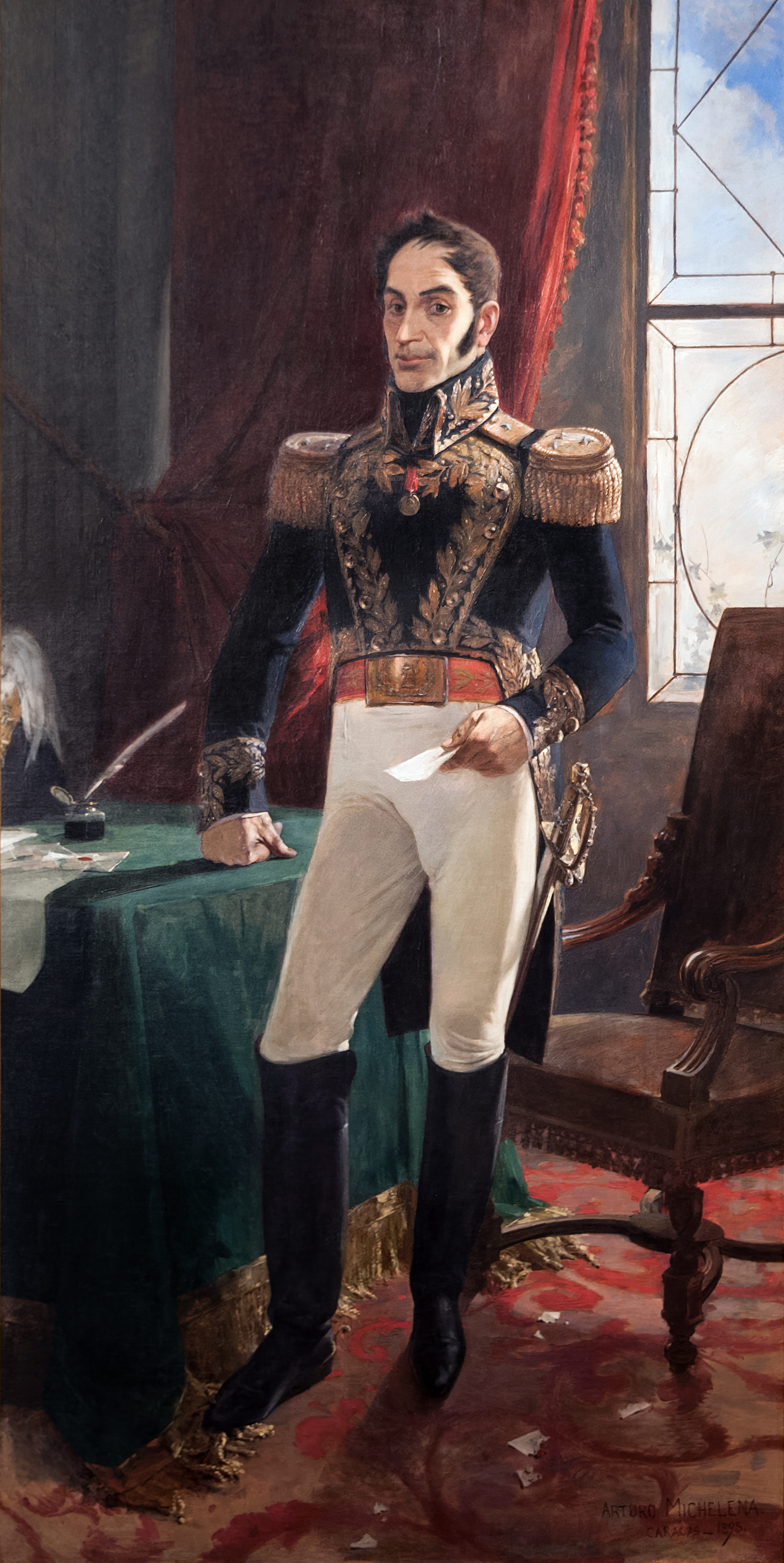
Simón Bolívar, the Orders namesake.

== Recipients ==
=== Collars ===
- (Italy) Giuseppe Saragat (1965)
- (Malaysia) Mahathir Mohamad (1990)
- (Spain) Juan Carlos I (1977)
- (Ecuador) Rafael Correa
- (Indonesia) Suharto
- (Iran) Mahmoud Ahmadinejad (2007)
- (Guyana) Cheddi Jagan (1993)
- (Belarus) Alexander Lukashenko (2007)
- (Russia) Dmitry Medvedev (2008)
- (Turkey) Recep Tayyip Erdoğan (2008)
- (Chile) Michelle Bachelet (2009)
- (Russia) Vladimir Putin (2010)
- (Ba'athist Syria) Bashar al-Assad (2010)
- (China) Xi Jinping (2014)

=== Grand Cordon ===
- (Bangladesh) Muhammad Yunus (2007)
- (Kingdom of Italy) Benito Mussolini (1928)

=== Officer ===
- (Netherlands) A.J. van Koolwijk

=== Unclear ===
- Karl Schädler (1894)

== Abolishment and replacement ==
In 2010, the National Assembly of Venezuela decided to officially abolish the order and replace it with the Order of the Liberators of Venezuela, a revival of the medal created by Simón Bolívar in 1813 to honor participants of the Admirable Campaign.

The new order, unlike its predecessor, has 3 classes, in ascending order:

- Arrow of the Liberators
- Lance of the Liberators
- Sword of the Liberators

The President is the order's Grand Master, and has full authority over appointments to the Order. He or she wears the collar of the Sword of the Liberators class of the order.
