= Dera Gay =

Cultural celebration of Aruba

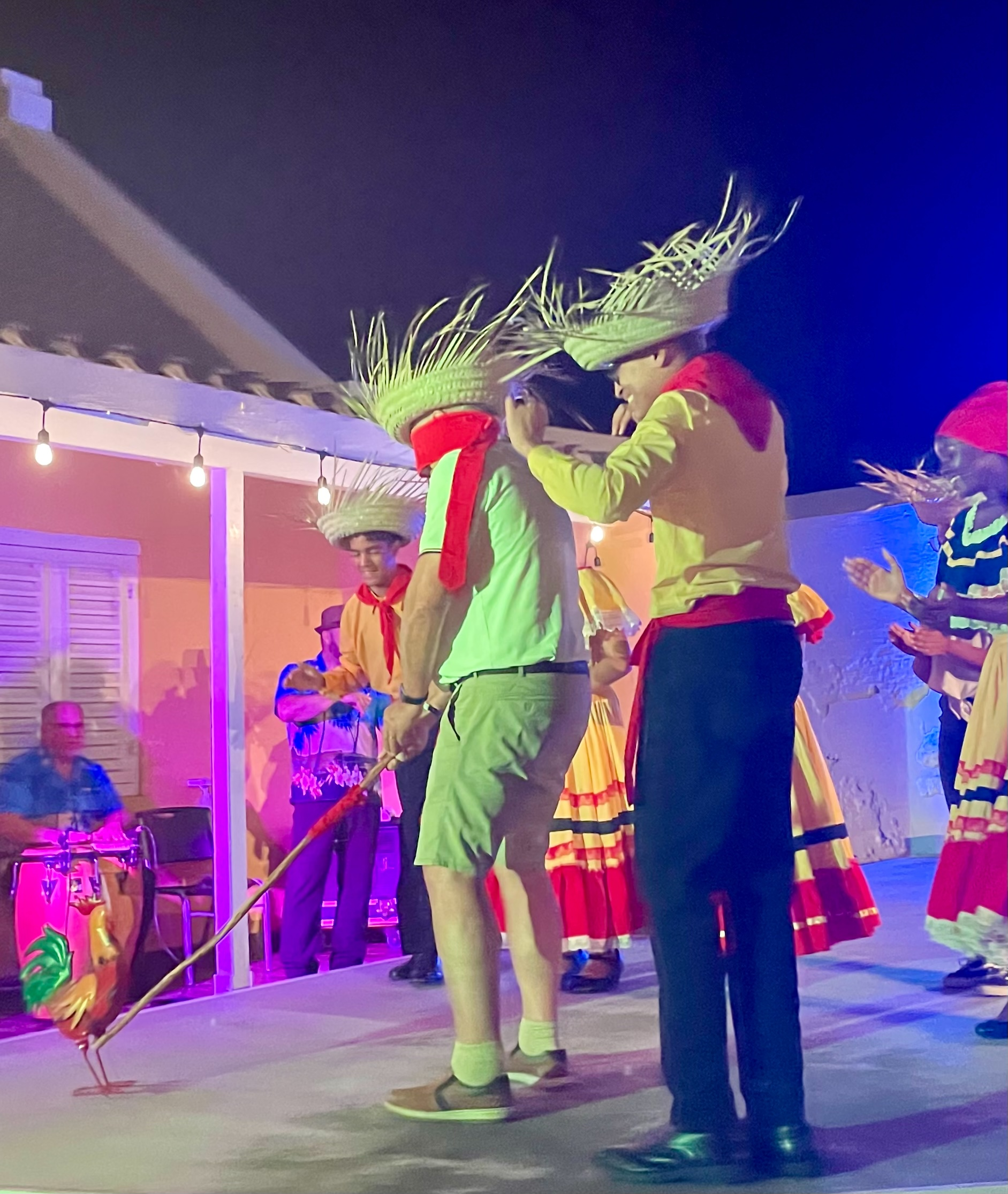
Demonstration of Dera Gai at Bonbini Festival in Fort Zoutman (2023).

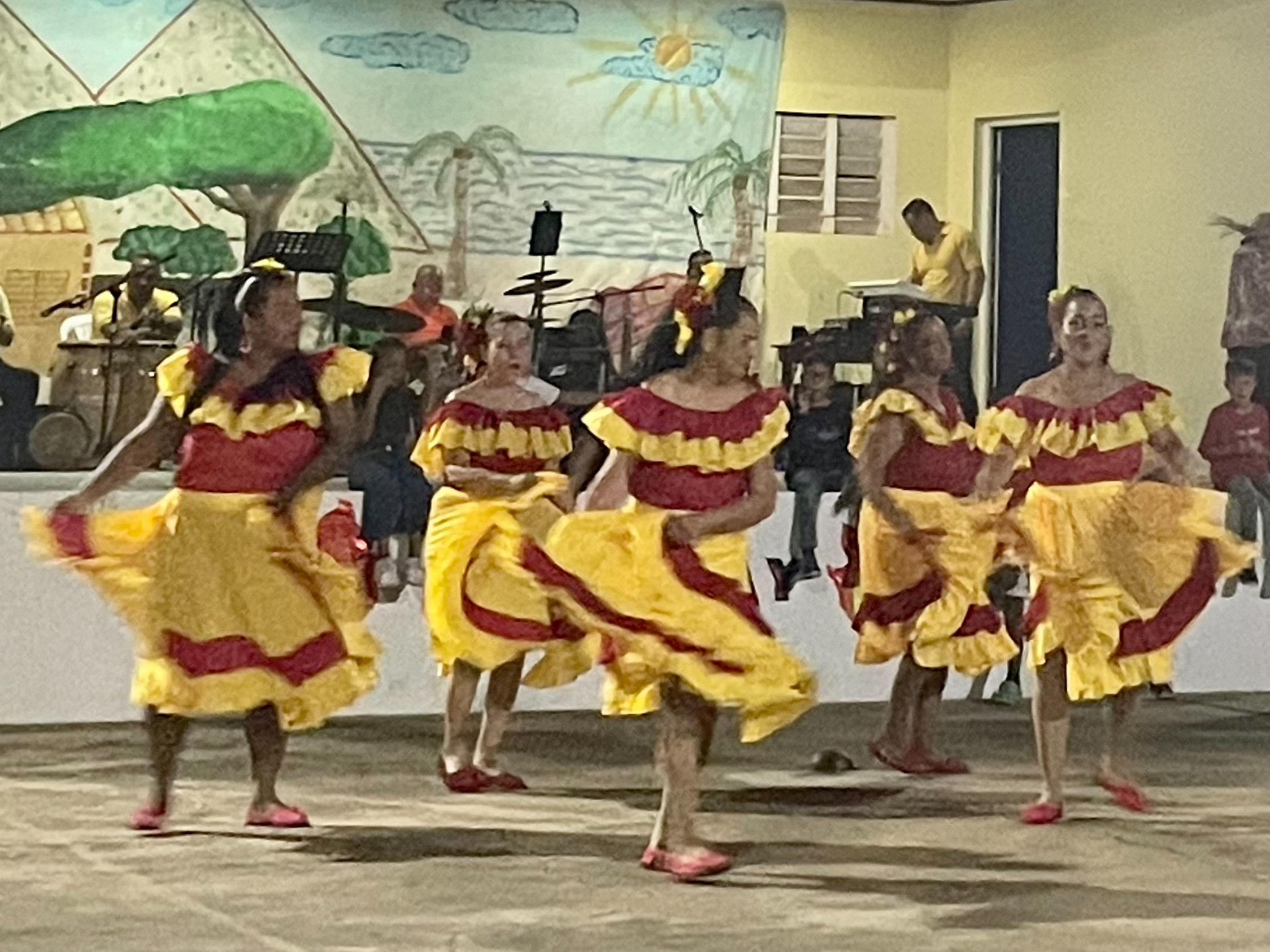
Dera Gay celebration in Noord (2023).

Dera Gay or Dera Gai (literally: 'to bury the rooster') is a traditional celebration in Aruba, particularly associated with Dia di San Juan (St. John the Baptist Day) on June 24. In the past, it involved lighting bonfires on the eve of St. John's day, signaling the upcoming holiday. Bonfires were fueled by the remains of the previous year's harvest, a practice symbolizing preparation for the new growing season. Men, fueled by singing and music, used to leap over the flames, but this custom faded due to concerns about fire safety. Nowadays, fires are lit all over the island on St. John the Baptist Day itself.

A persistent belief advises against fishing or swimming on St. John's Day due to strong northeast trade winds. In Aruba, the celebration takes the form of Dera Gai, an Aruban harvest festival and cultural event featuring traditional song and dance. Songs were played by violin, guitar, wiri, and tambú. The festival includes a unique ritual, historically involving the symbolic burial of a rooster.

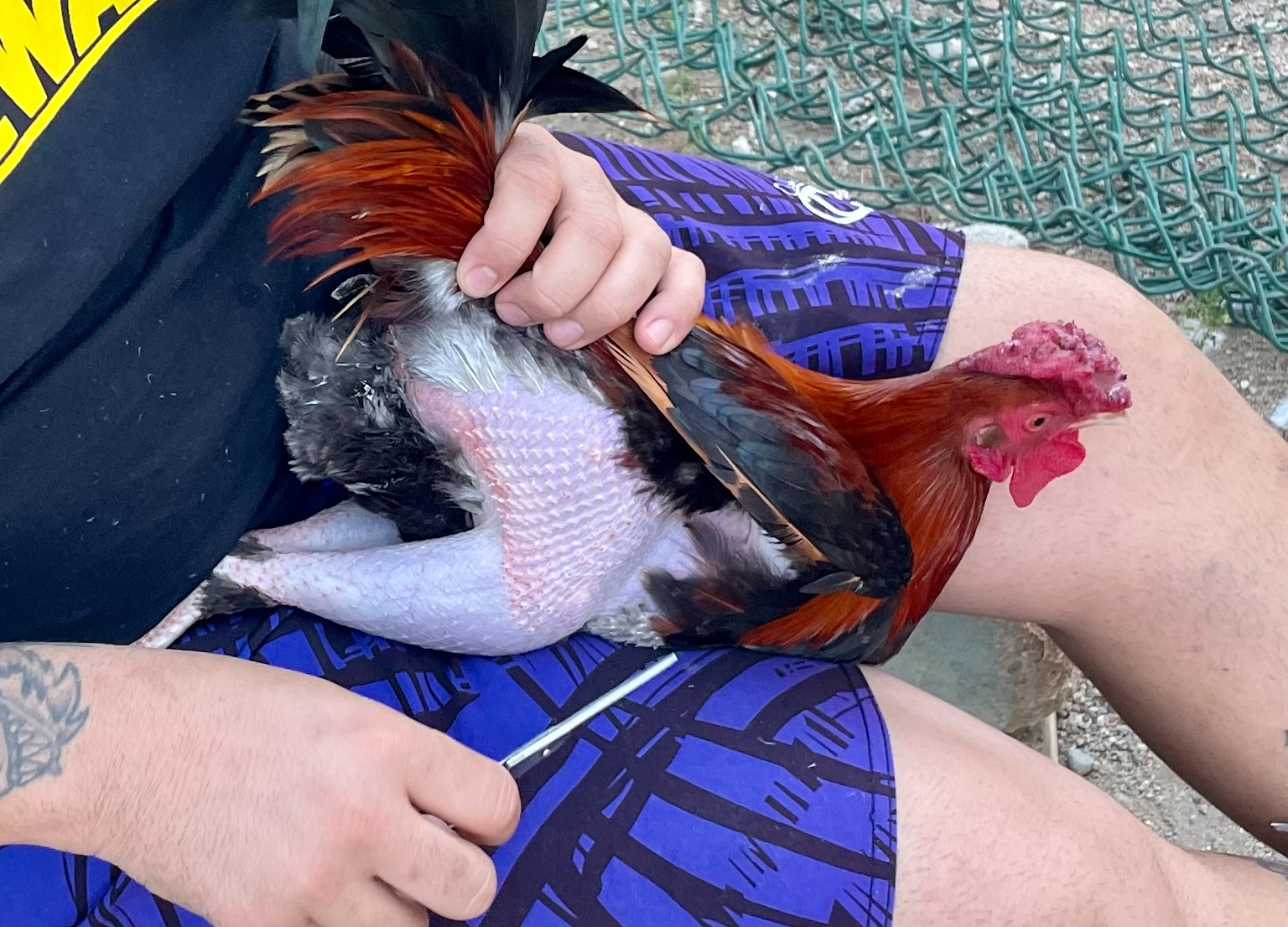
Grooming of a fighting cock (removal of feathers around the legs where skin will then turn brownred) in the Rancho, Aruba quarter of -Oranjestad, Aruba.

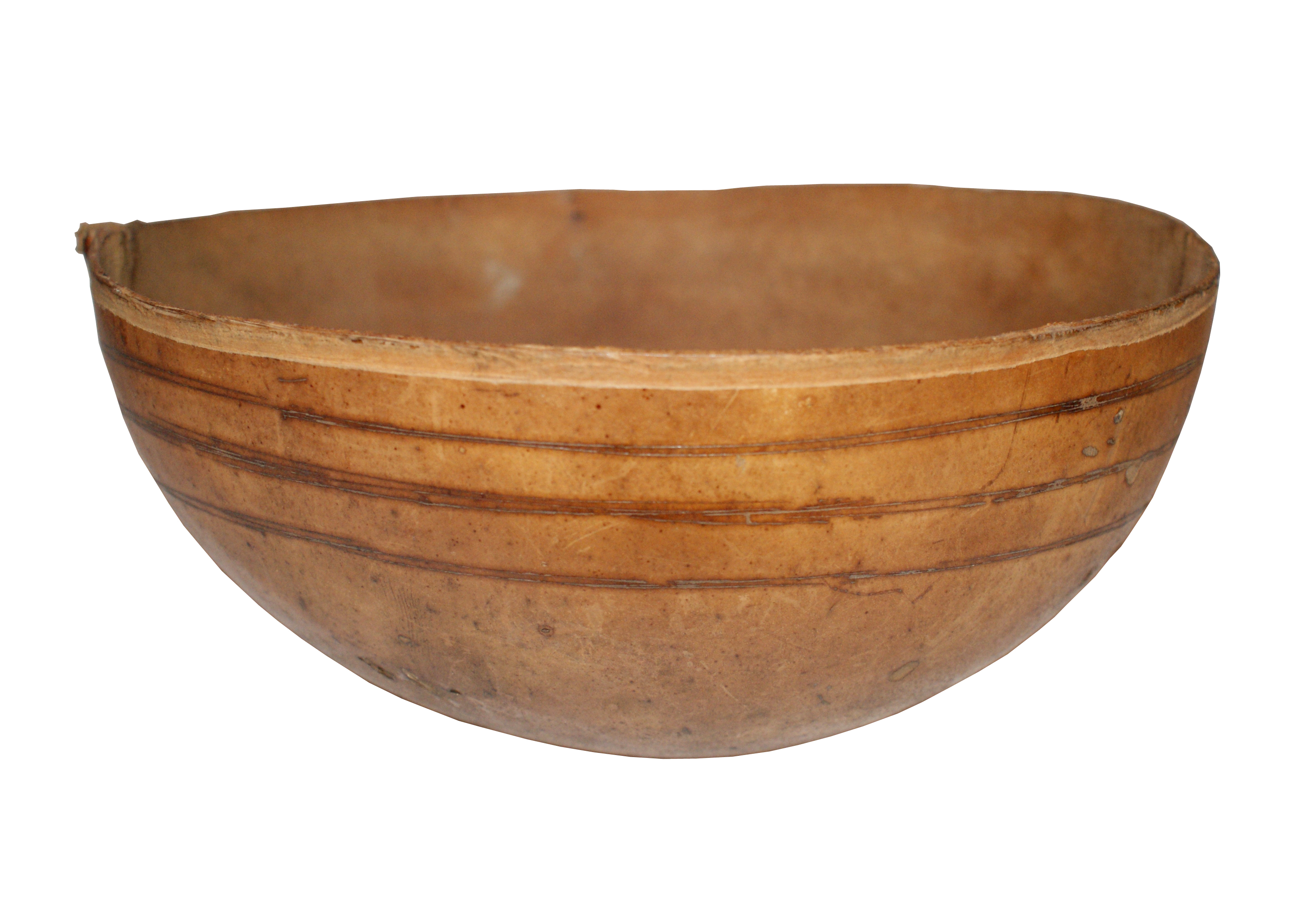
Dried calabash.

In the traditional Dera Gai ritual, a hole is dug, and a rooster is placed inside with only its head protruding often covered with a green or dried Calabash gourd. The rooster symbolizes the betrayal of Jesus Christ by Judas. Participants, blindfolded, attempt to hit rooster encouraged by music and singing. The festivals include symbolic attire with females wearing yellow outfits representing the kibrahacha flower (Tabebuia billbergii), and males donning black trousers, white shirts, and a yellow tie.

This holidays is widely celebrated, with both pagan and Christian symbols that reflect the influences of the Arawak natives and the Spanish missionaries, respectively. This festival is no longer as widely practiced, nowadays, the rooster is omitted, and only the calabash and a plastic rooster serves as the target for the reenactment.

== Sources ==
- Römer, René A. (1978). Cultureel Mozaïek van de Nederlandse Antillen: Constanten en Varianten [Cultural Mosaic of the Netherlands Antilles: Constants and Variants] (in Dutch). Zutphen: Walburg Pers. ISBN 9789060110836.
