= National Archaeological Museum Aruba =

- Museo Arqueologico Nacional Aruba
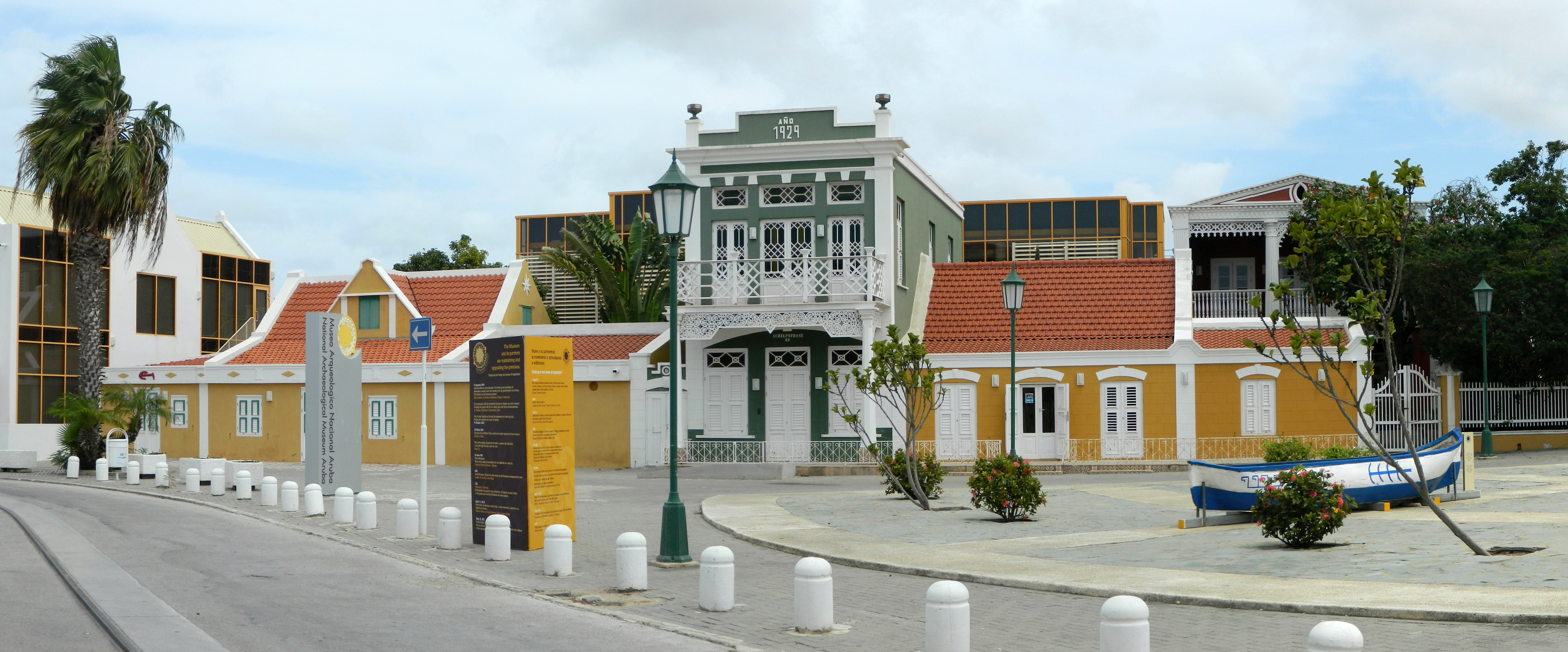
- Museum in 2013

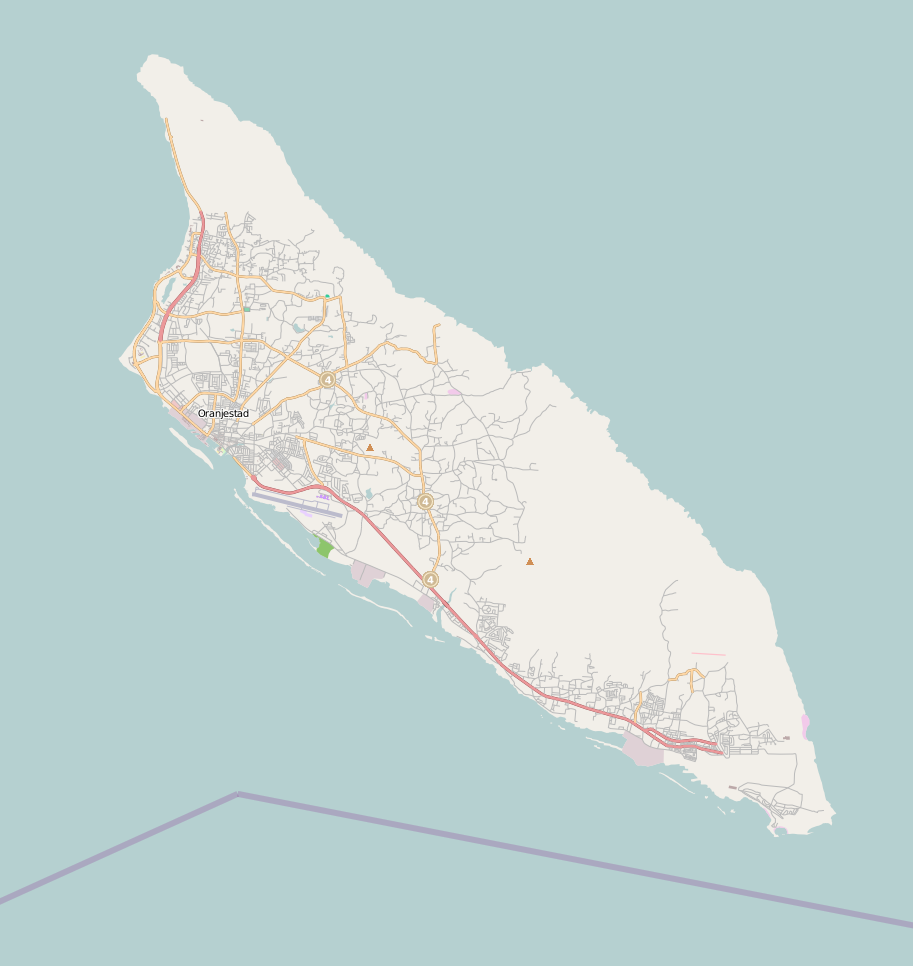
- Location in Aruba
- Former name: Archaeological Museum of Aruba (1981–2009)
- Established: 1981
- Location: Schelpstraat 42; Oranjestad, Aruba
- Coordinates: 12.5209°N 70.0382°W
- Type: Archaeological museum
- Website: www.manaruba.org

The National Archaeological Museum Aruba (Papiamento: Museo Arqueologico Nacional Aruba) is an archaeological museum in the city of Oranjestad in Aruba. The collections cover from 2500 BCE to the 19th century.

In 1981, the Archaeological Museum of Aruba was opened. In 2009, the museum had moved to a new location and was reopened as the National Archaeological Museum Aruba.

== See also ==
- List of museums in Aruba
- A.J. van Koolwijk
