= Jan Valckenier Suringar =

Dutch botanist

Jan Valckenier Suringar (24 December 1864, in Leiden – 17 October 1932) was a Dutch botanist. His surname is spelled "Valckenier Suringar" with the name "Valckenier" being his mother's maiden name. He was the son of botanist Willem Frederik Reinier Suringar 1832–1898.

From 1896 to 1899 he worked in the Leiden Rijksherbarium, and in the meantime obtained his doctoral degree at the University of Leiden in 1898. He later taught classes at the agricultural, horticultural and forestry school in Wageningen and in 1900 he became director of the Wageningen botanical garden. From 1918 to 1924 he was a professor of dendrology at the newly founded agricultural university in Wageningen.

== Published works ==
Among his writings was a 1908 biography of Carl Linnaeus titled Linnaeus. He was also the author of the following works:

- Musée botanique de Leide, (1871–1897); with W. F. R. Suringar and Melchior Treub – The botanical museum at Leiden.
- Het geslacht Cyperus (sensu amplo) in den Maleischen Archipel benevens een overzicht van de geschiedenis der systematiek van de familie der cyperaceen. (1898) – On Cyperus in the Malay Archipelago, in addition to an overview to the history of systematics of the family Cyperaceae.
- Contributions à l'étude des espèces du genre Melocactus des Indes néerlandaises occidentales, 1901 – Contributions to the study of species within the genus Melocactus from the Dutch West Indies.
