= Boy Ecury =

Aruban-Dutch resistance member (1922–1944)

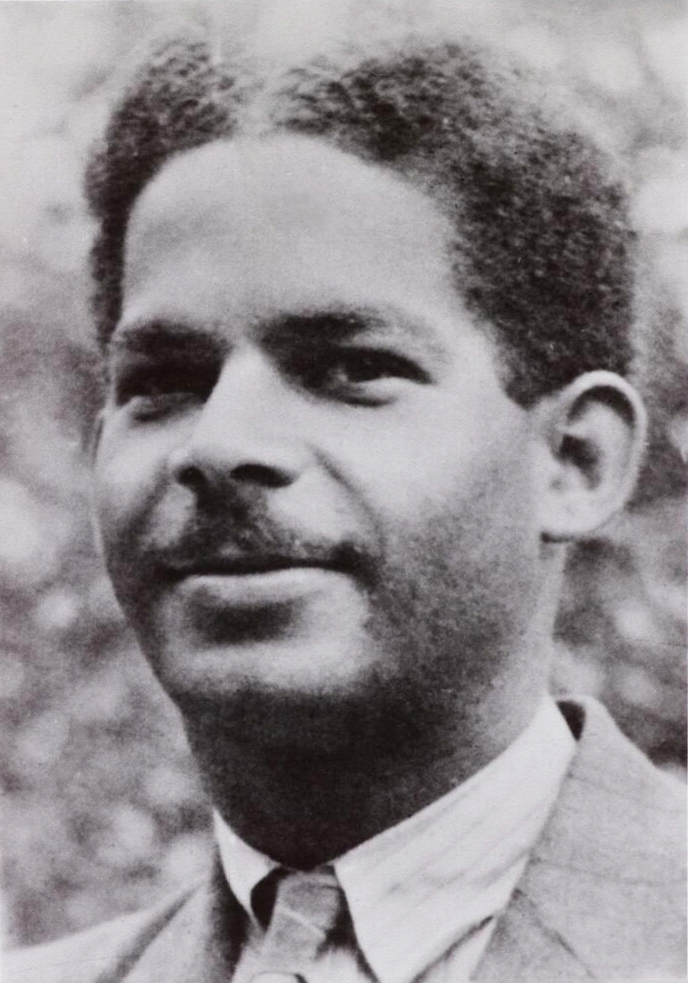
- Born: Segundo Jorge Adelberto Ecury; 22 April 1922; Oranjestad, Aruba
- Died: 6 November 1944 (aged 22); The Hague, Netherlands
- Occupation: Resistance fighter

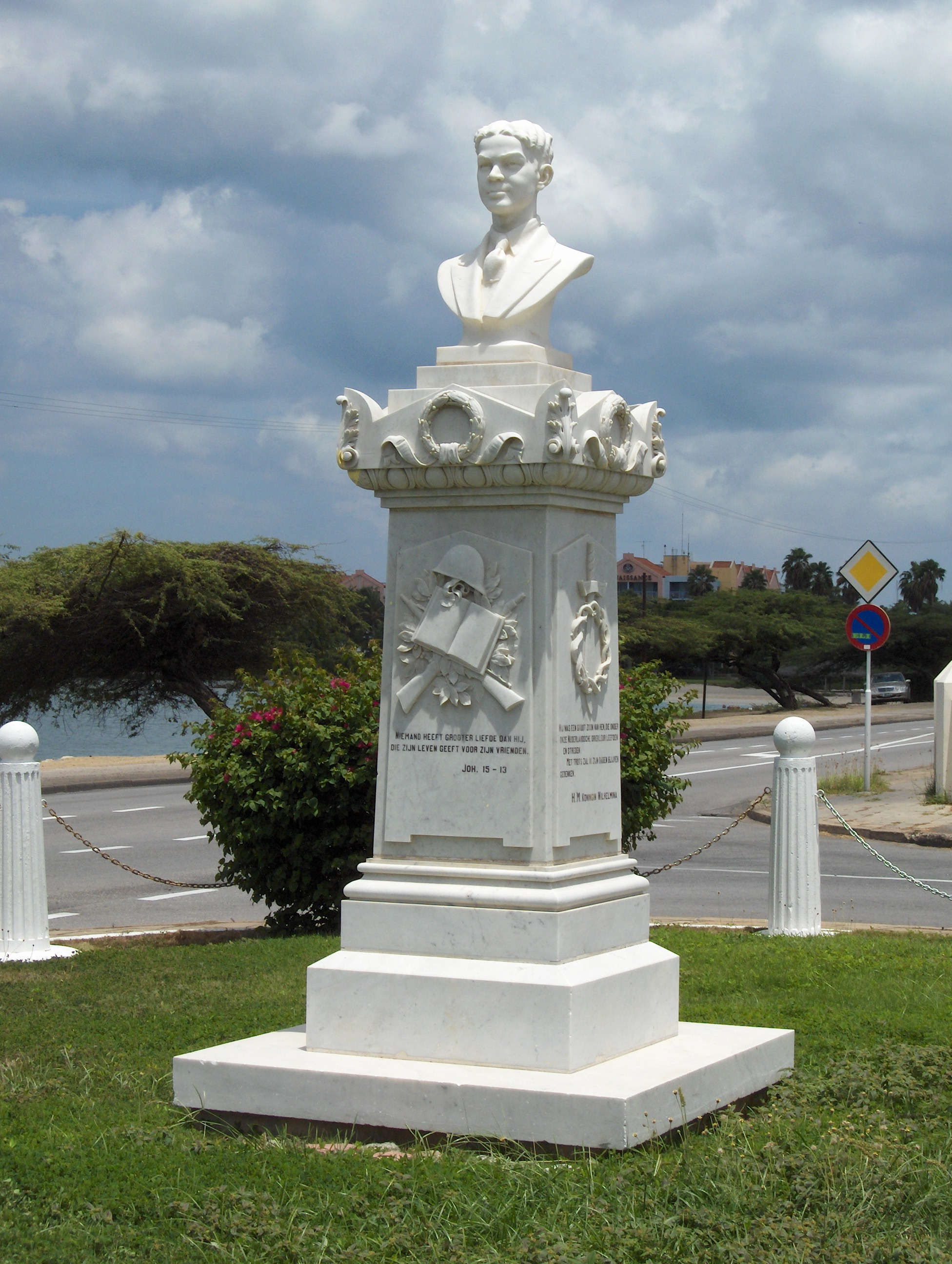
Statue of Boy Ecury in Oranjestad, Aruba

Boy Ecury (23 April 1922 – 6 November 1944) was a member of the Dutch resistance in World War II.

== Biography ==
He was born in Oranjestad, Aruba, an island of the Dutch Antilles in a large family. Ecury was born the seventh of thirteen children. His father was a wealthy businessman. His given name was Segundo Jorge Adelberto Ecury, but he went by the nickname Boy and it is by that name that he is remembered.

After a brief stint at a military academy in Puerto Rico, together with his brother, he was sent to study in the Netherlands.

Ecury graduated in 1937 with a diploma in commerce from the Brother of St. Louis School in Oudenbosch, and he did a lot of travelling around the Netherlands. He lived there when World War II started in 1939 and witnessed first hand the Nazi invasion in 1940.

While in the Dutch city of Tilburg, Ecury became friends with another young man, Luis de Lannoy, also from the Antilles, who was part of an underground resistance group in the city. The group carried out sabotage operations, planting bombs on German trucks and roads. Members of the underground movements also went out of their way to help injured Allied troops and civilians who needed help.

Ecury sometimes went along and helped out on covert operations and later became a member of the Resistance Council in Oisterwijk. Like his resistance colleagues and because of the colour of his skin, Ecury had to live a life in hiding, and lived in various places around the Netherlands, working on a number of missions. In 1944, he was in hiding with the underground in the Hague and planning an assassination of an NSB member.

Some members betrayed their colleagues, and many of them were captured by the Nazis, including Luis, who was imprisoned and tortured in Utrecht. Ecury tried, but was unsuccessful in his attempts to free his friend.

On 5 November 1944, Ecury, who had been one of many betrayed by Kees Bitter, was arrested in Rotterdam by the Sicherheitsdienst (SD) and taken to the "Oranjehotel" (a former prison turned into concentration camp). He was interrogated and tortured, but refused to betray his friends. On the following day, he was executed on the Waalsdorpervlakte by a German firing squad. He was 22 years old.

His body was discovered in 1947, and his father brought his son's body back from the Netherlands. He was given a funeral with military honours in Oranjestad. Two years later, a statue of the local hero was erected in the town and still stands today. He is also the subject of an exhibition in the town's war museum and his former family home houses the Archaeological Museum. Forty years after his death, Ecury was posthumously honored by the Dutch government and awarded a Resistance Heroes Commemorative Cross.

Boy Ecury and his father's quest for the truth about his son's last years were subject of a book which was used as the basis for the 2003 movie Boy Ecury by Dutch film director Frans Weisz.
