= Winssen =

- Village
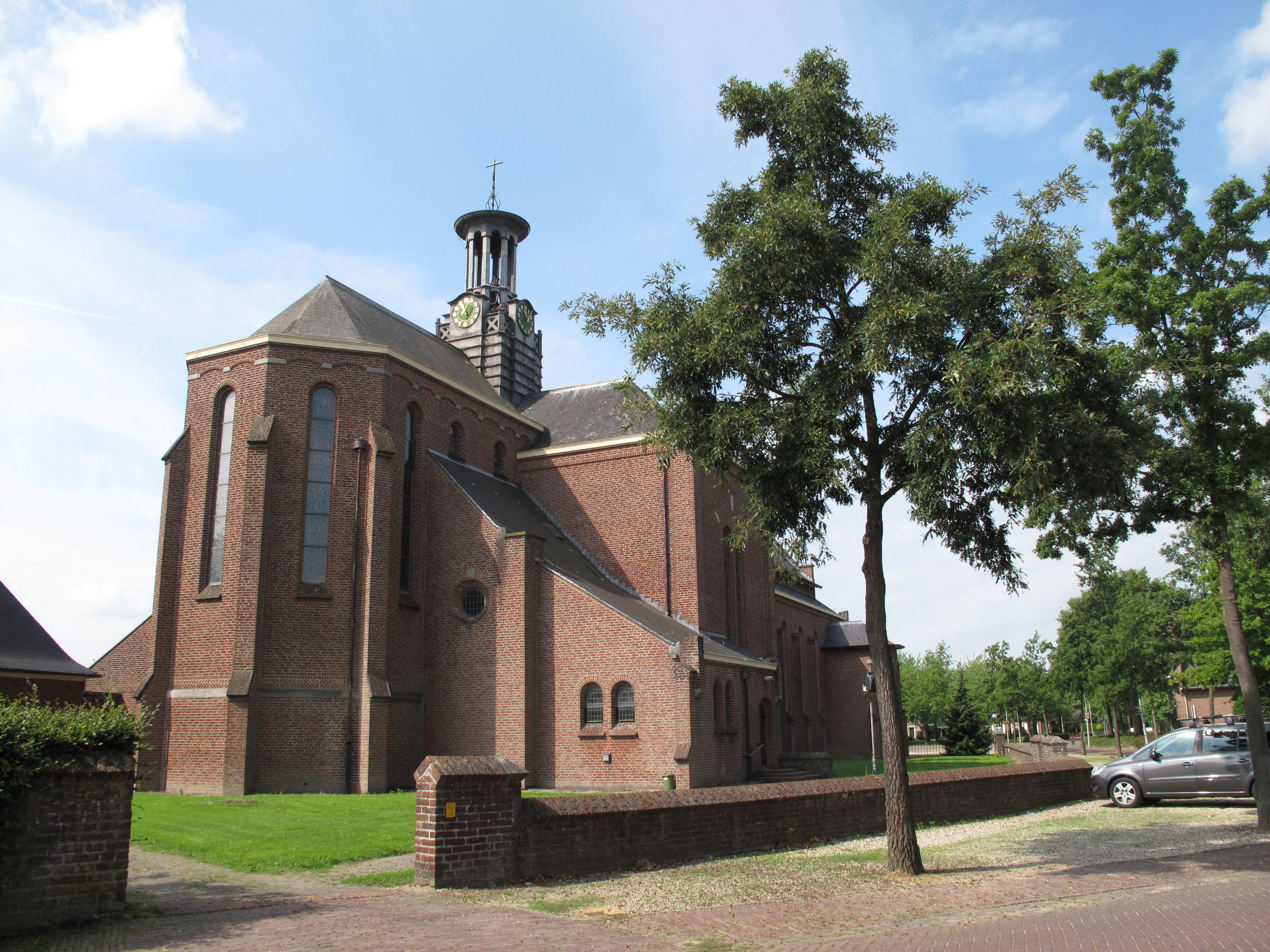
- Church of Winssen

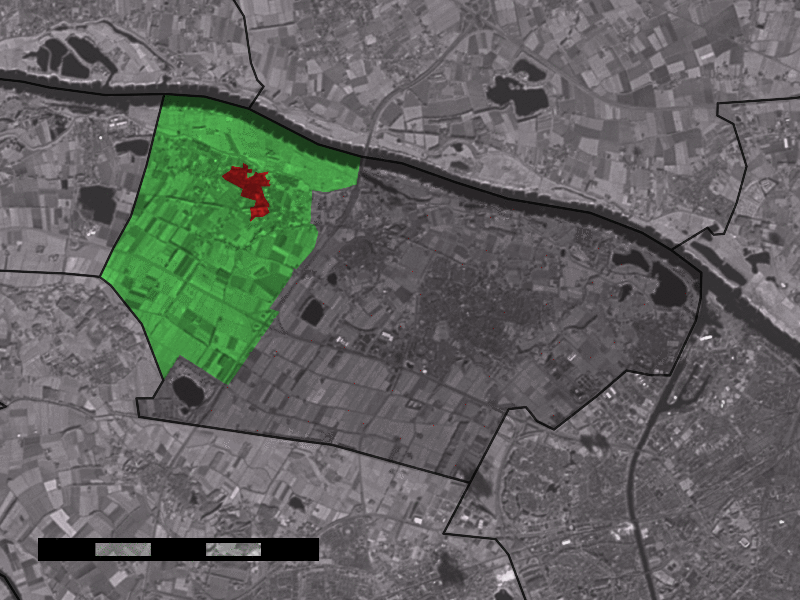
- The village centre (red) and the statistical district (light green) of Winssen in the municipality of Beuningen.

- Location in the province of Gelderland in the Netherlands Winssen (Netherlands)
- Coordinates: 51°53′N 5°42′E
- Country: Netherlands
- Province: Gelderland
- Municipality: Beuningen

Area
  - Total: 14.16 km^{2} (5.47 sq mi)
- Elevation: 8 m (26 ft)

Population (2021)
  - Total: 2,160
  - Density: 153/km^{2} (395/sq mi)
- Time zone: UTC+1 (CET)
  - Summer (DST): UTC+2 (CEST)
- Postal code: 6645
- Dialing code: 0487

Winssen (Dutch pronunciation: [ˈʋɪnsə(n)]) is a village in the Dutch province of Gelderland. It is the smallest village of the municipality of Beuningen, and lies about 8 km north of Wijchen. It lies south of the river Waal.

Winssen was a separate municipality until 1818, when it was merged with Ewijk.

It was first mentioned in 1153 as Winisen. The etymology is unclear. Huis te Winssen was a castle located near the village. In 1584, it fell in Spanish hands, and was destroyed by the citizens of Nijmegen. It was later rebuilt, but demolished around 1815. In 1840, Winssen was home to 909 people.

The Beatrixmolen is a grist mill from 1791 which was originally located in Alphen. In 1858, it was rebuilt and moved to Winssen. In 1988, it was restored.

== Gallery ==
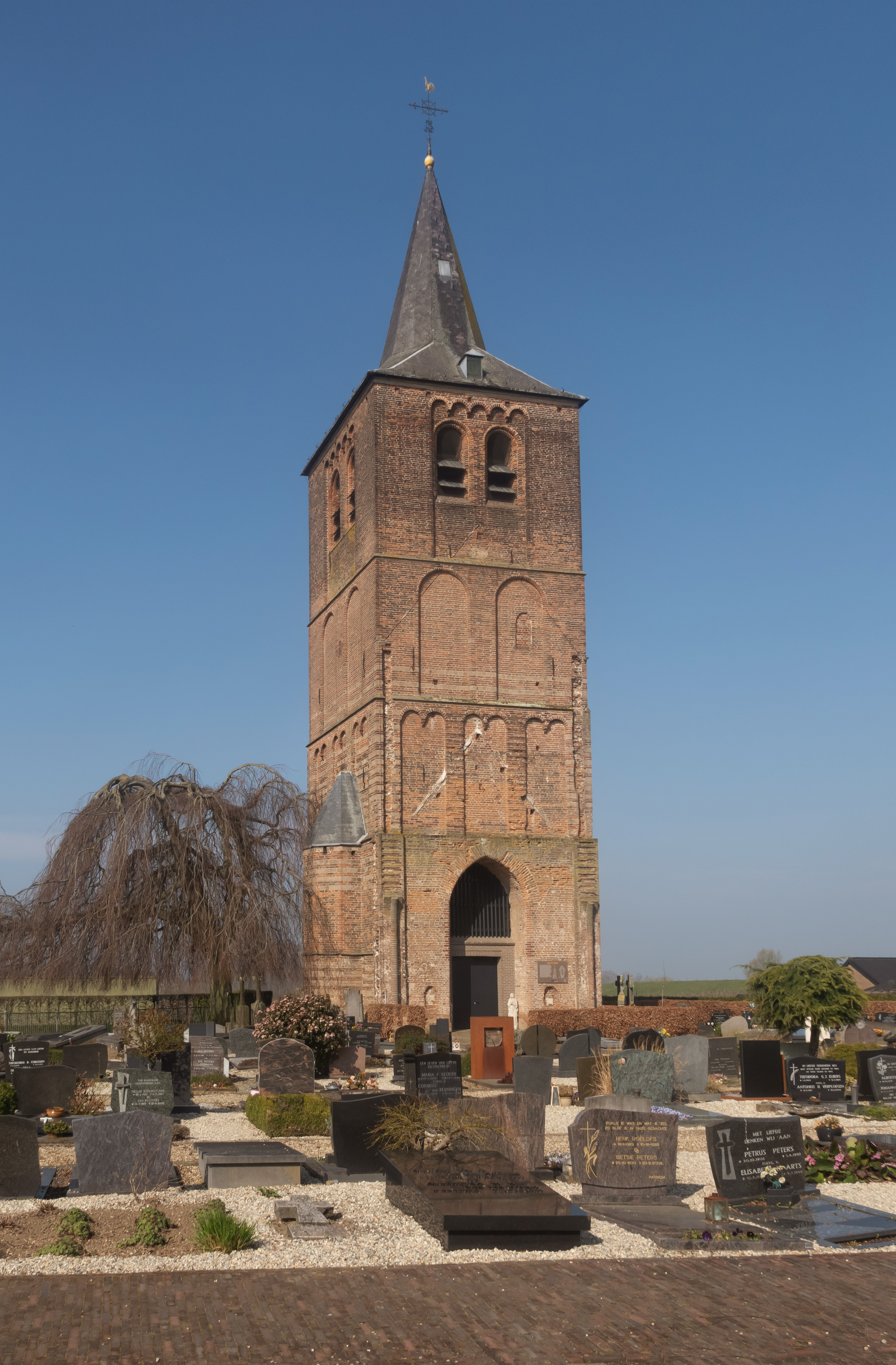
Winssen, tower near church yard

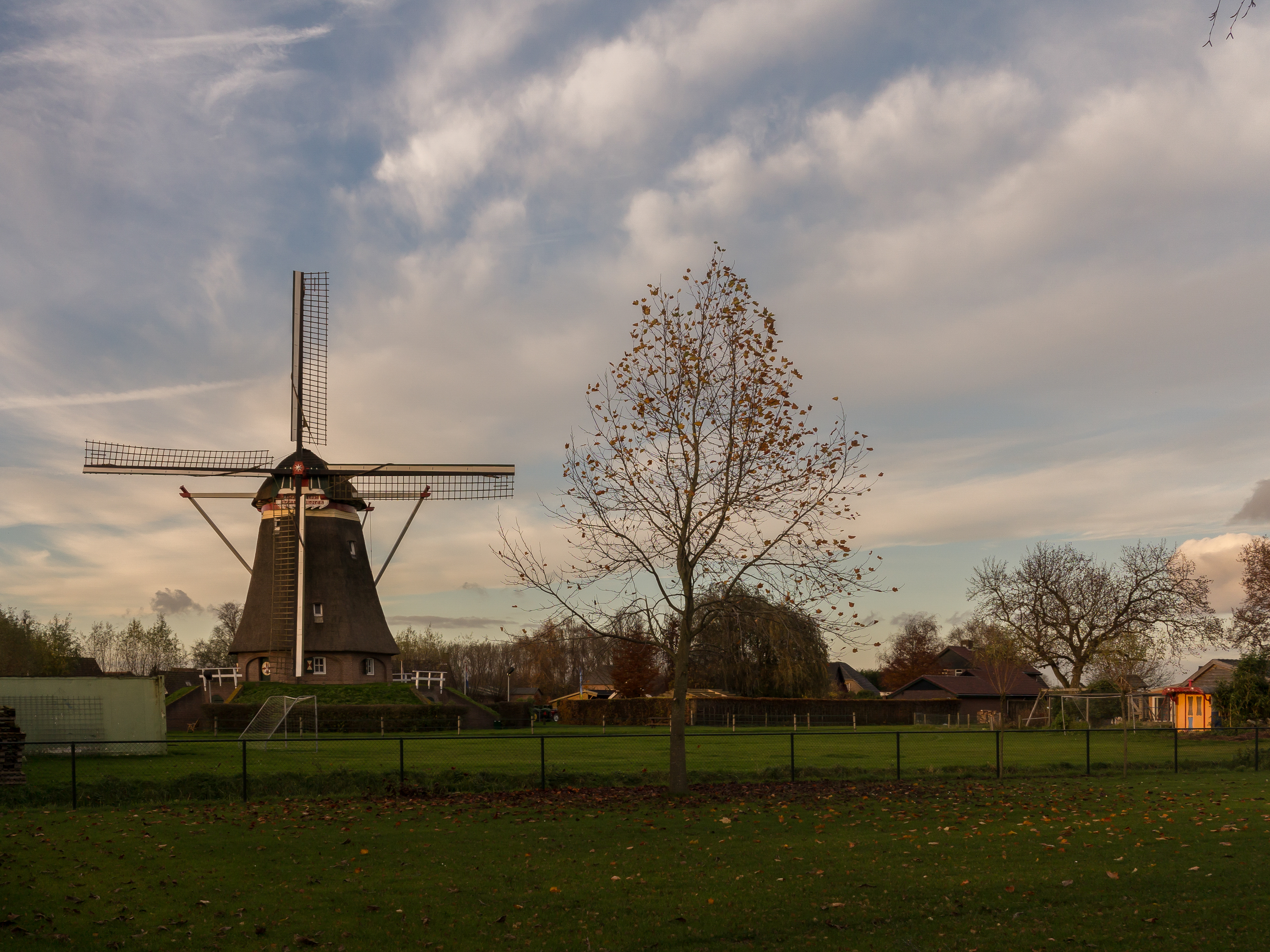
Winssen, windmill

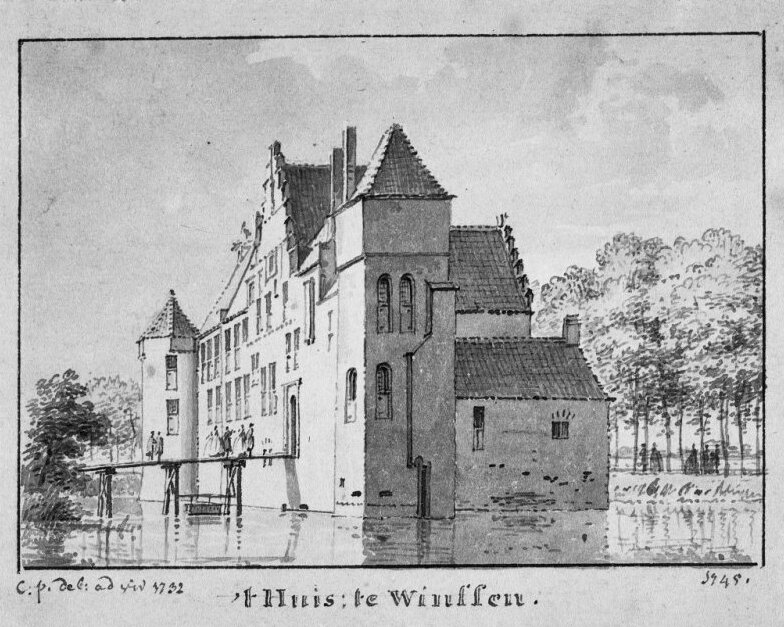
Huis te Winnsen (1732–1745)

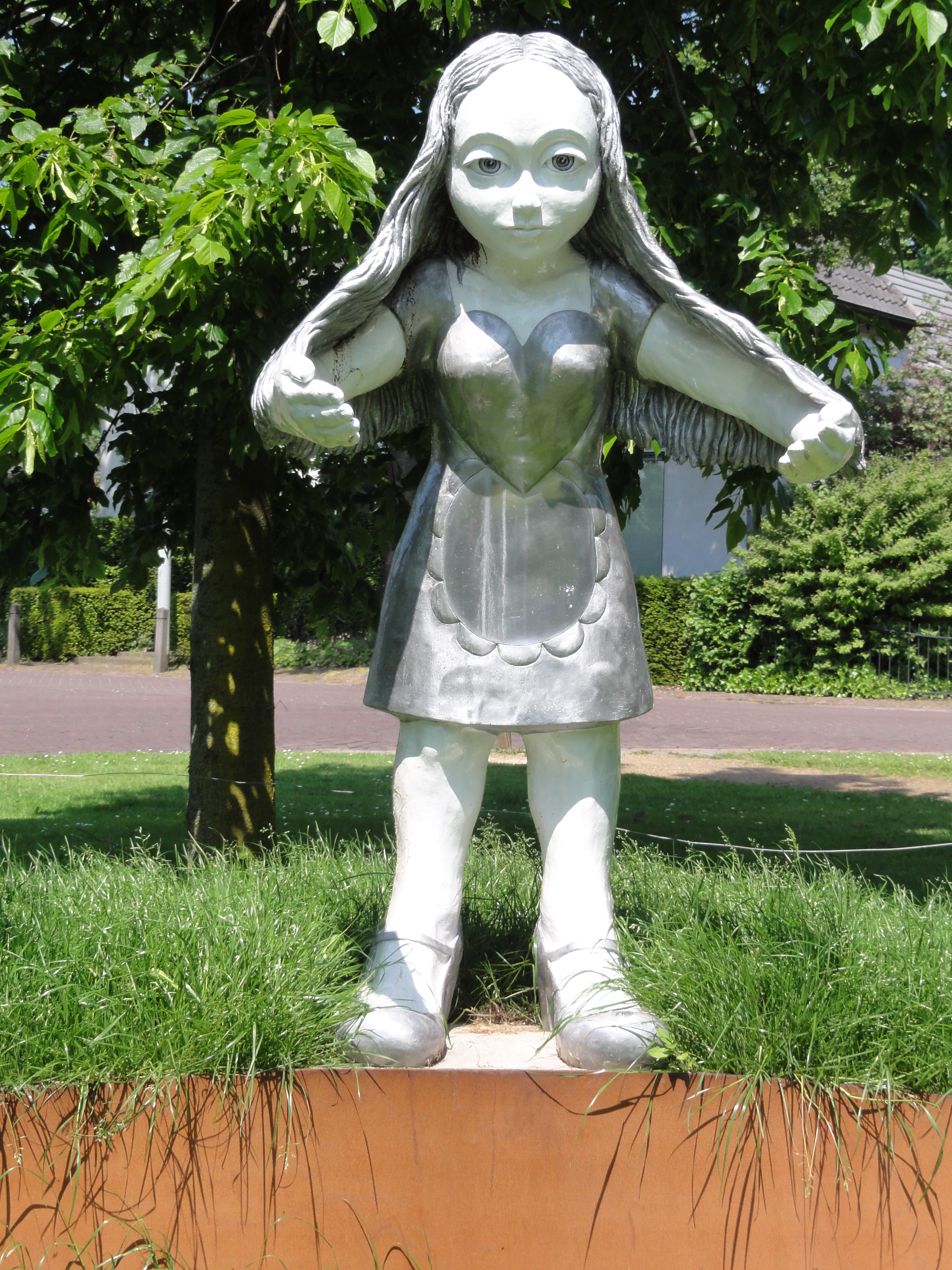
Statue by Ineke Kaagman
