= Beuningen =

- Municipality
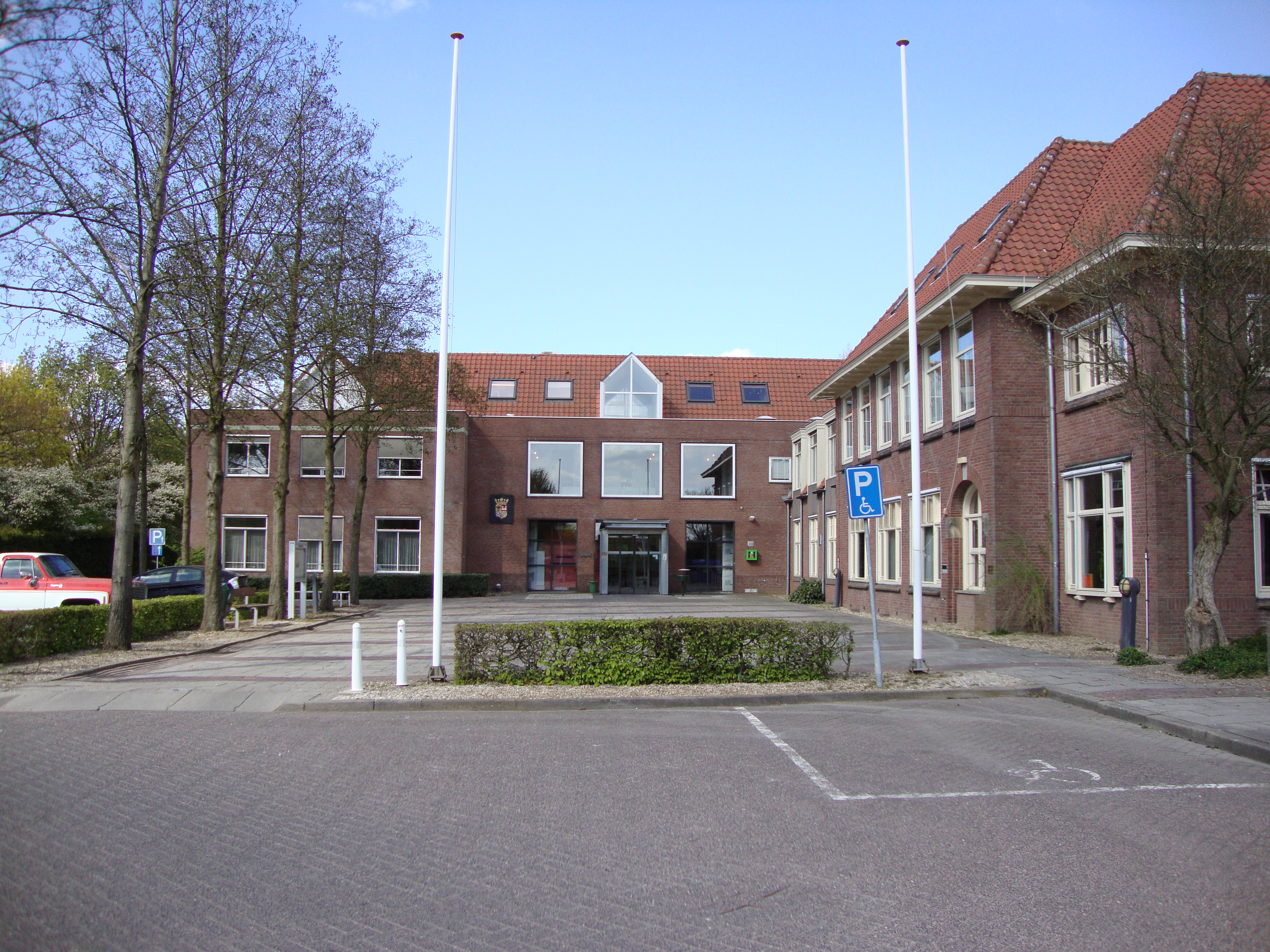
- Beuningen town hall

- Flag Coat of arms

- Location in Gelderland
- Coordinates: 51°52′N 5°47′E
- Country: Netherlands
- Province: Gelderland

Government
  - Body: Municipal council
  - Mayor: Daphne Bergman (acting) (D66)

Area
  - Total: 47.09 km^{2} (18.18 sq mi)
  - Land: 43.65 km^{2} (16.85 sq mi)
  - Water: 3.44 km^{2} (1.33 sq mi)
- Elevation: 9 m (30 ft)

Population (January 2021)
  - Total: 26,157
  - Density: 599/km^{2} (1,550/sq mi)
- Demonym: Beuninger
- Time zone: UTC+1 (CET)
  - Summer (DST): UTC+2 (CEST)
- Postcode: 6550–6551, 6640–6645
- Area code: 024, 0487
- Website: www.beuningen.nl

Beuningen (Dutch pronunciation: [ˈbøːnɪŋə(n)]) is a municipality and a town in the eastern Netherlands. The municipality consists of the towns Beuningen, Ewijk, Winssen and Weurt. 1.5 kilometres (1 mi) to the north lies the river Waal

Beuningen lies adjacent to the A73 (Nijmegen-Venlo, on the south side) and A50 (Zwolle-Eindhoven, in the west) motorway interchange. East of Beuningen lies the city Nijmegen. Beuningen had a population of 26,157 in 2021. There is a restored windmill in the town, De Haag.

== Population centres ==
- Beuningen
- Ewijk
- Weurt
- Winssen

== History ==
The area in and around Beuningen was inhabited by the Romans. There are regularly excavations done in which Roman rests are found. In the 15th century there stood a small castle: Blanckenburgh. It was probably destroyed during the Eighty Years' War by Maurice of Orange. Until about 1900 Beuningen was a poor farmers village, often struck by floods. Nevertheless, there were a few rich families, mostly farmers with a lot of land, who paid the highest tax in the area. On 1 January 1818 the municipality annexed the town of Weurt to the east, and on 1 July 1980 the town of Ewijk to the west.

Nowadays Beuningen has grown to a suburb of Nijmegen, with a lot of new neighbourhoods.

== Topography ==
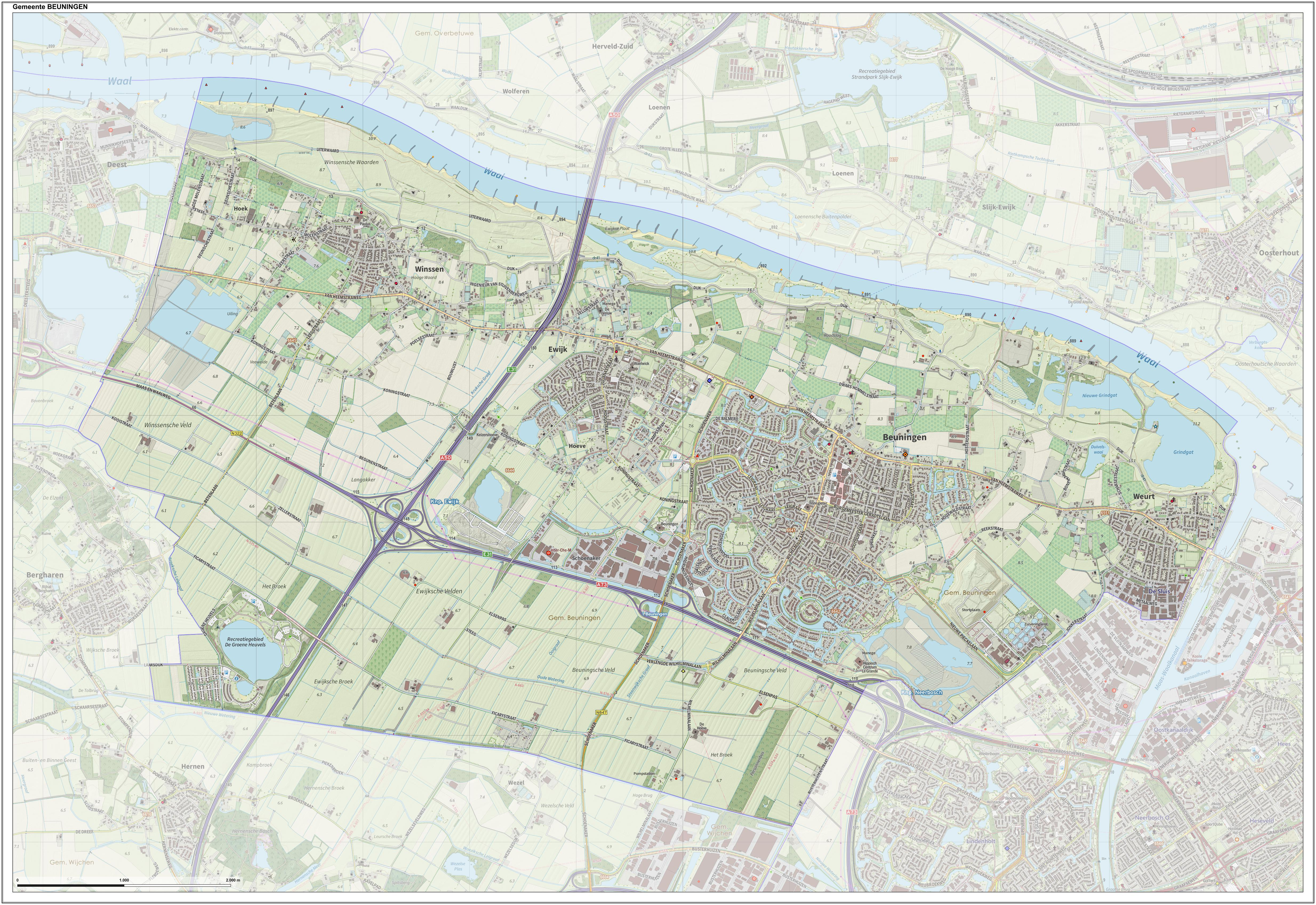

Dutch Topographic map of the municipality of Beuningen, June 2015.

== Monuments ==
There are several monuments in Beuningen. Here are a few (in chronological order):

- Blanckenburgh tower, 15th century
- De Haag Mill, 1704
- Kloosterstraat farm, 1774
- Olden Tempel, 1838
- Large Waardhuizenstraat T-farm, 1850 – 1900
- Mausoleum of Van 't Lindenhout, 1861
- Cornelius church, 1900–1901
- Vinkendael, 1900
- Coach house, ca. 1913
- Holy Heart statue, 1920
- Stone factory the Bunswaard, 1920

== See also ==
- Lancaster Memorial (Netherlands)

== Notable people ==
- Willem Joseph baron van Ghent tot Drakenburgh (1626 in Winssen – 1672) a 17th-century Dutch admiral
- Willie Smits (born 1957, in Weurt) a trained forester, microbiologist, conservationist, animal rights activist, wilderness engineer and social entrepreneur in Borneo
- Bas van Bemmelen (born 1989 in Beuningen) a volleyball player with the Netherlands men's national volleyball team

== Gallery ==
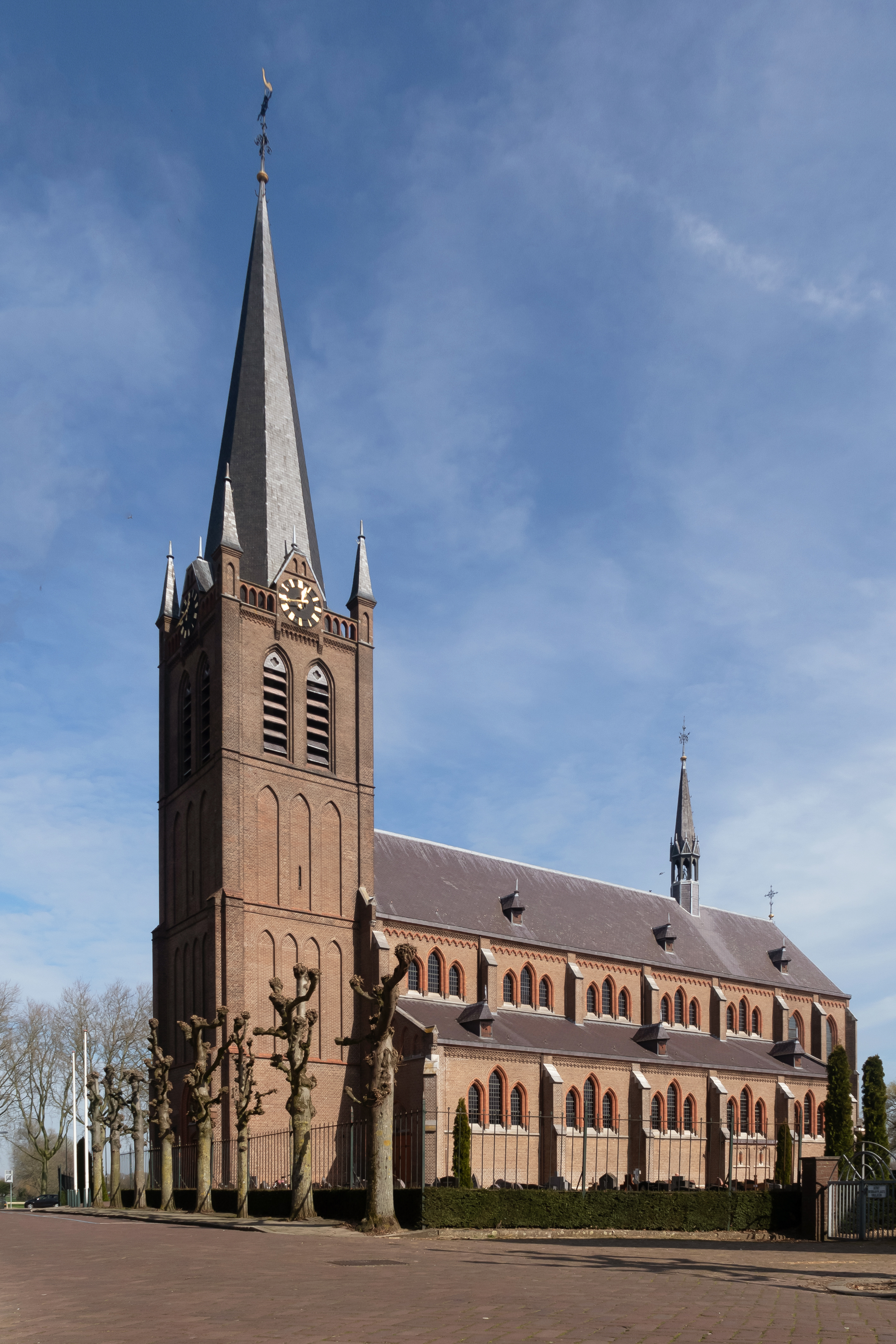
Beuningen, church: de Corneliuskerk

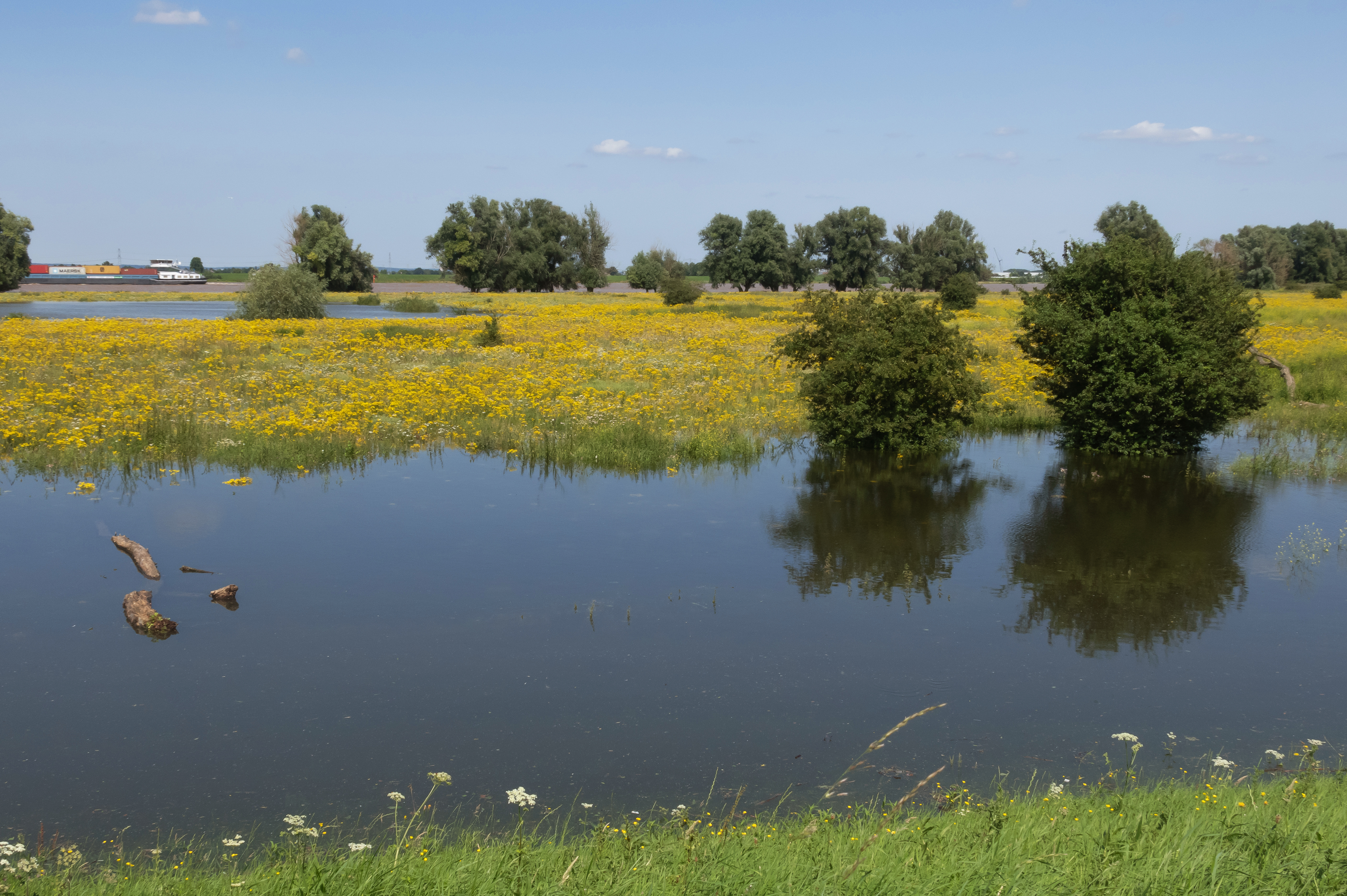
Beuningse Uiterwaarden during high water in the Waal

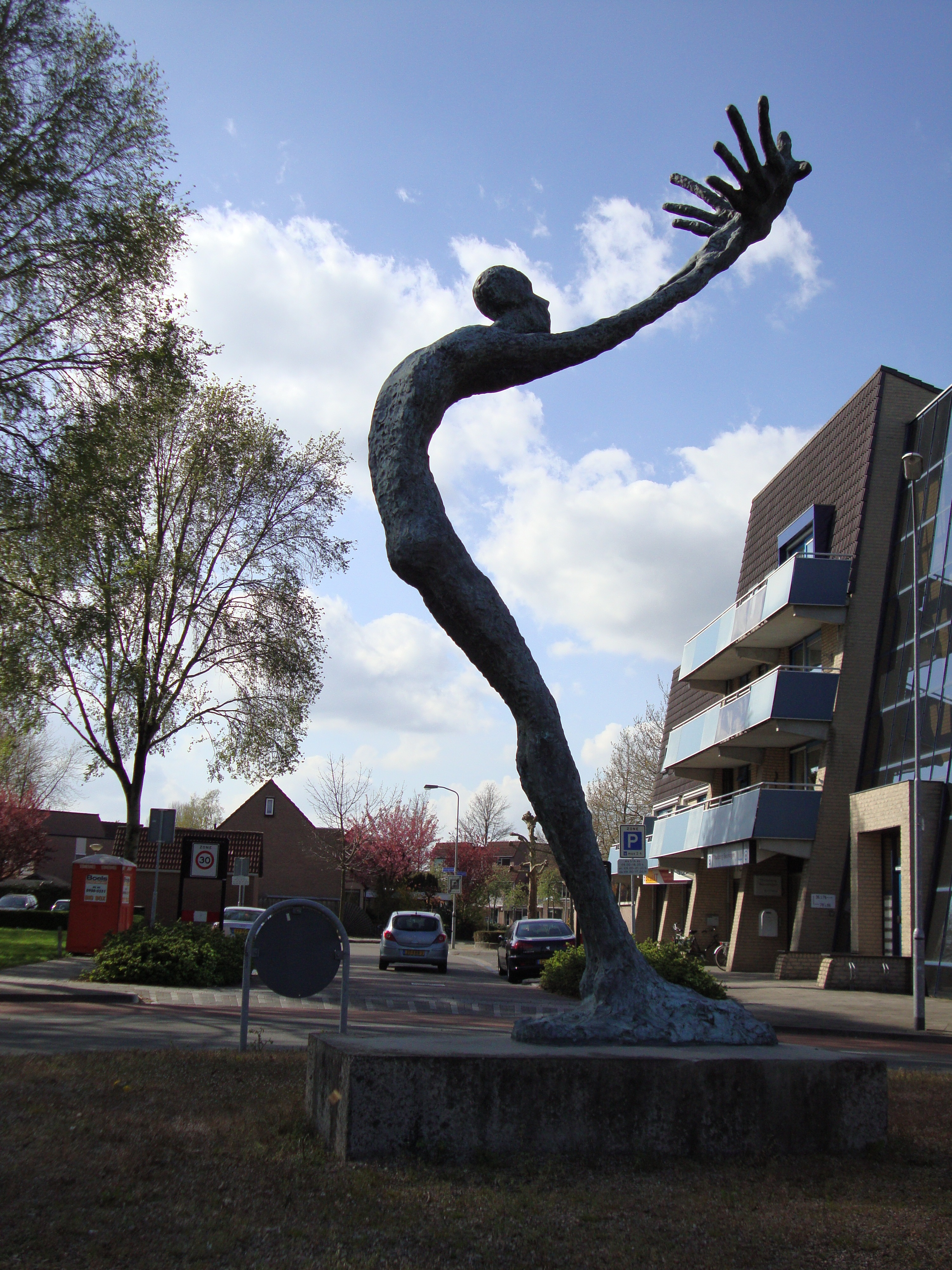
Sculptuur made by Ronald Tolman in Beuningen

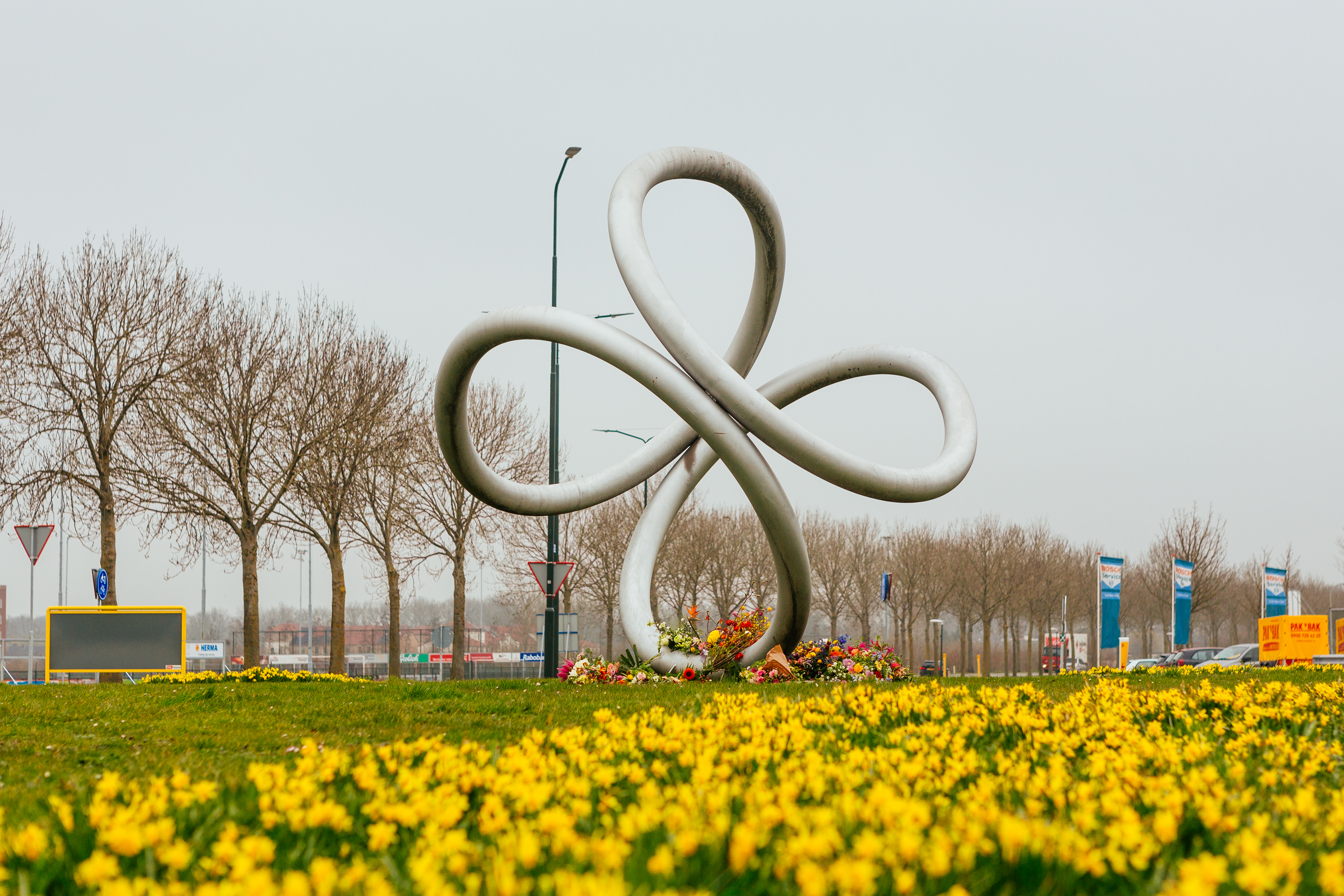
Artwork 'De Cirkel' by Anneke van Bergen on roundabout in Beuningen

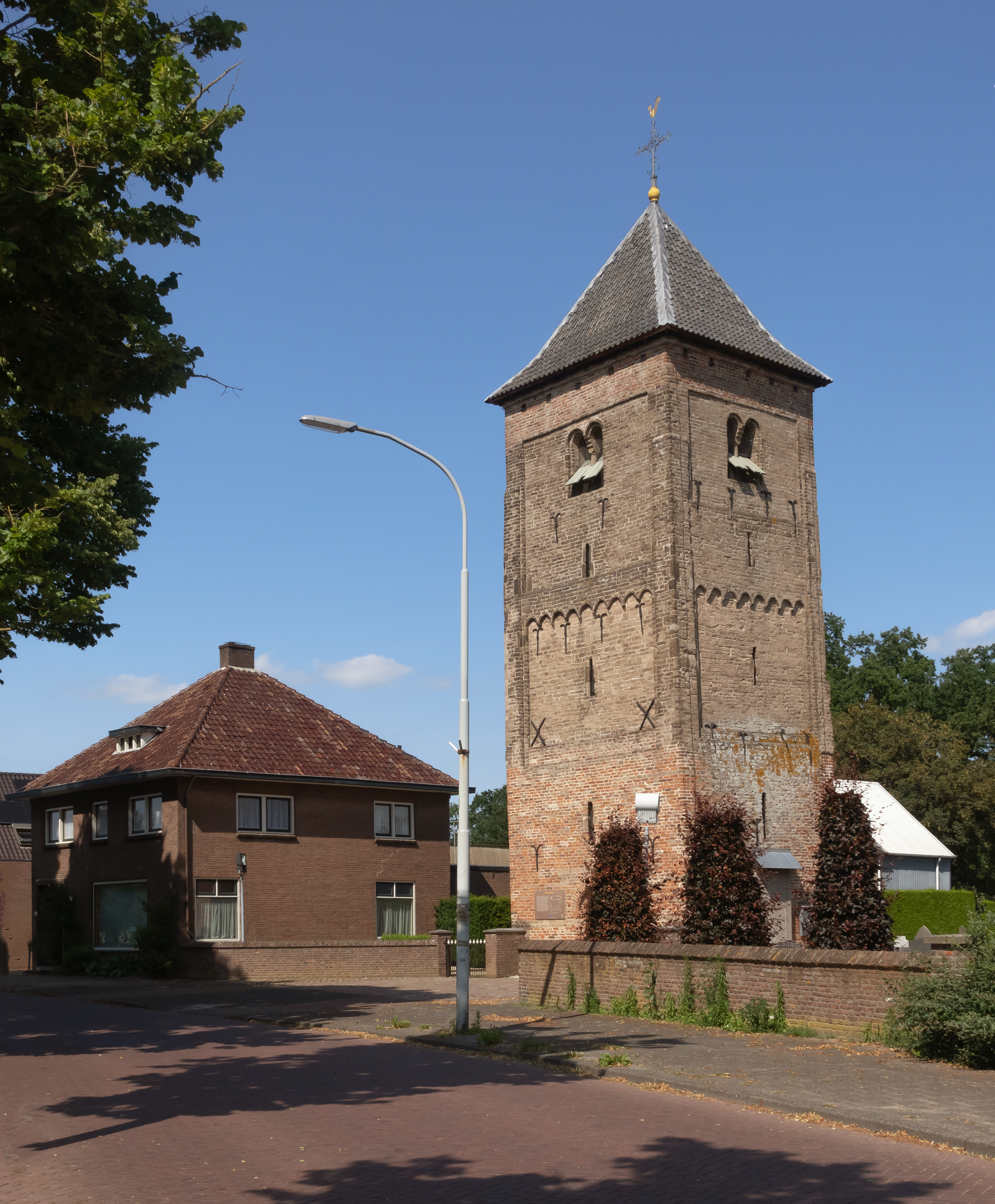
Ewijk, tower: the Oude Toren

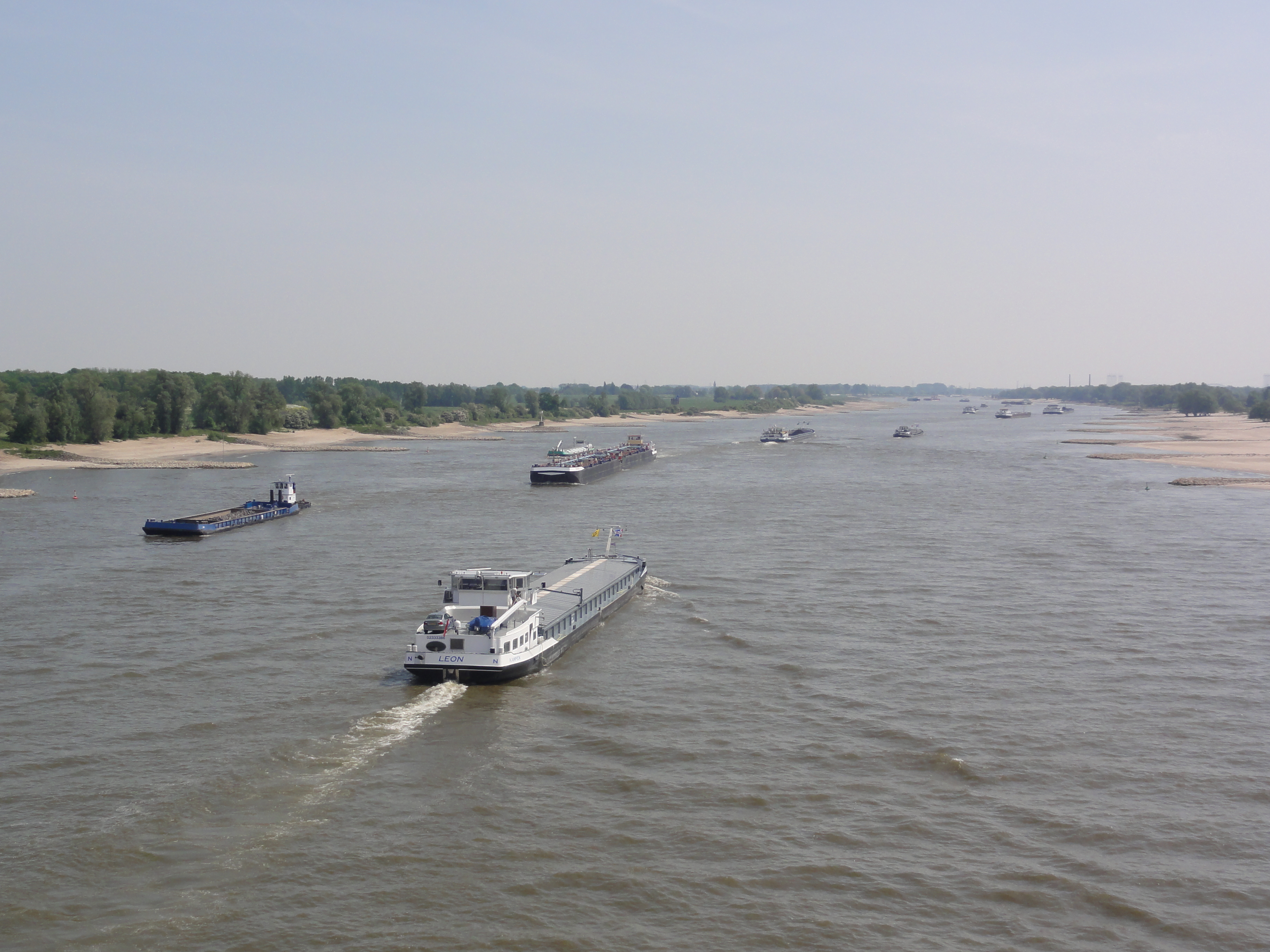
Ewijk, Beuningen, scheepvaart op de Waal

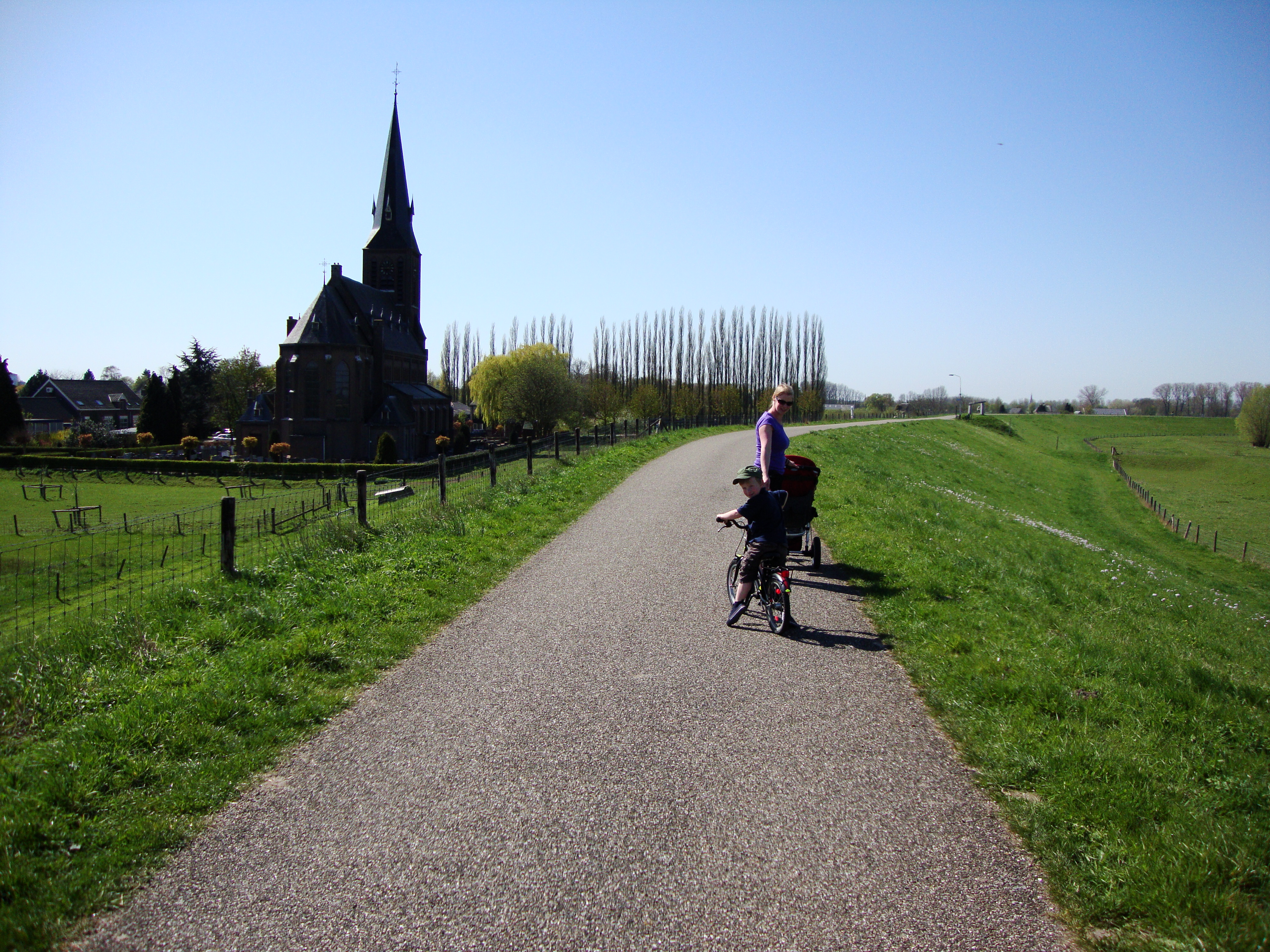
Weurt, Beuningen

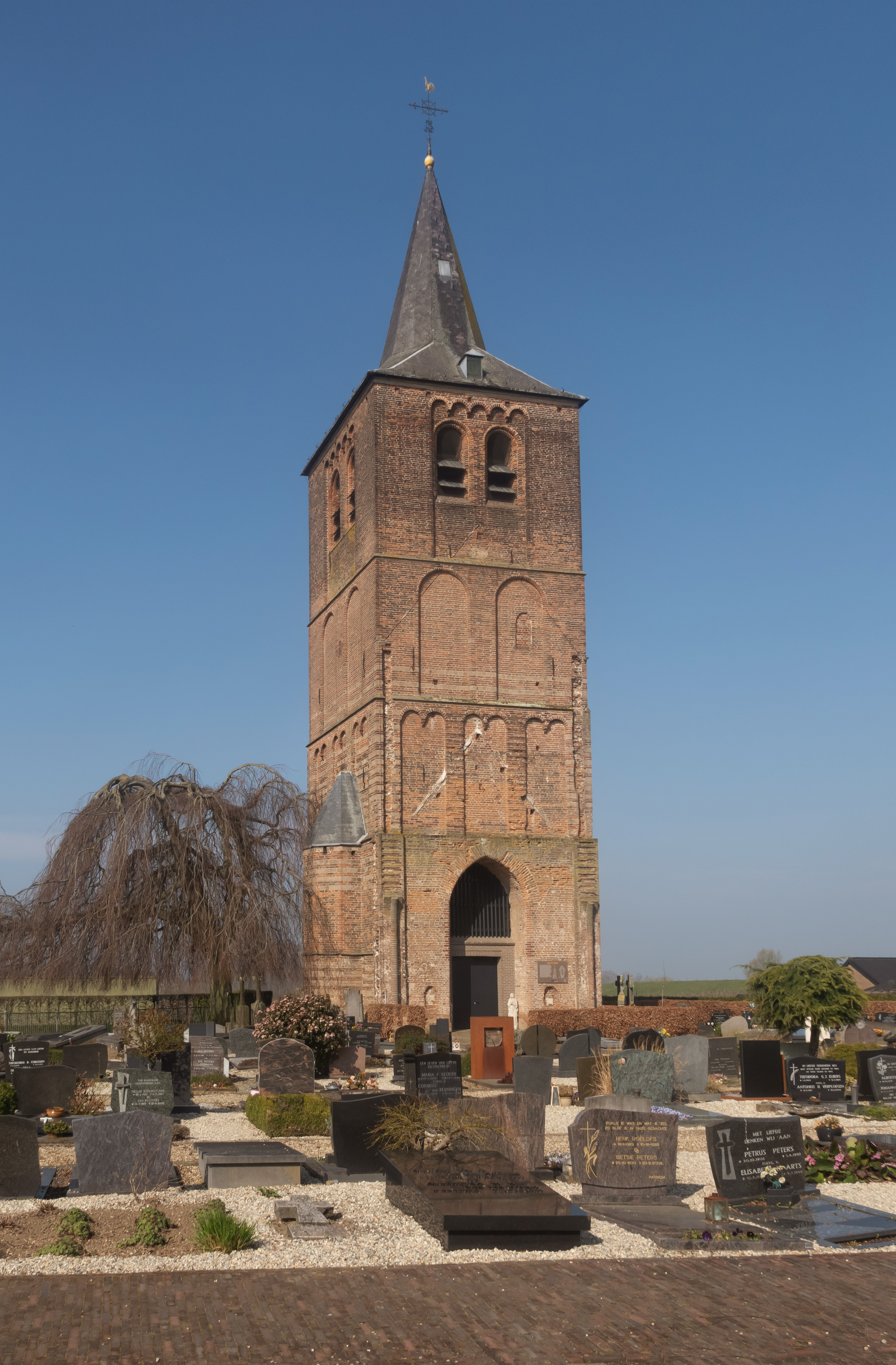
Winssen, medieval church tower
