= Weurt =

- Village
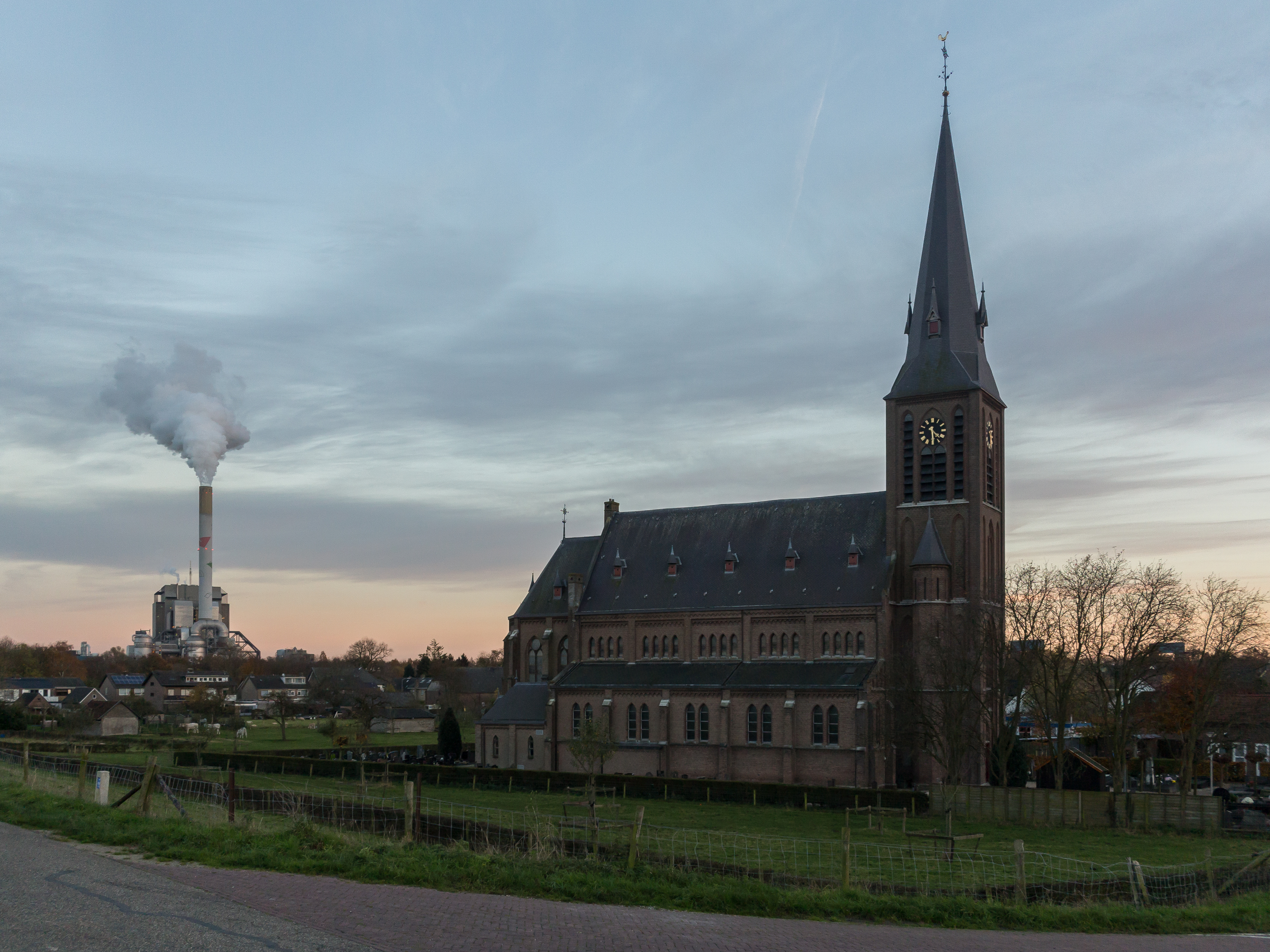
- Saint Andrew Church

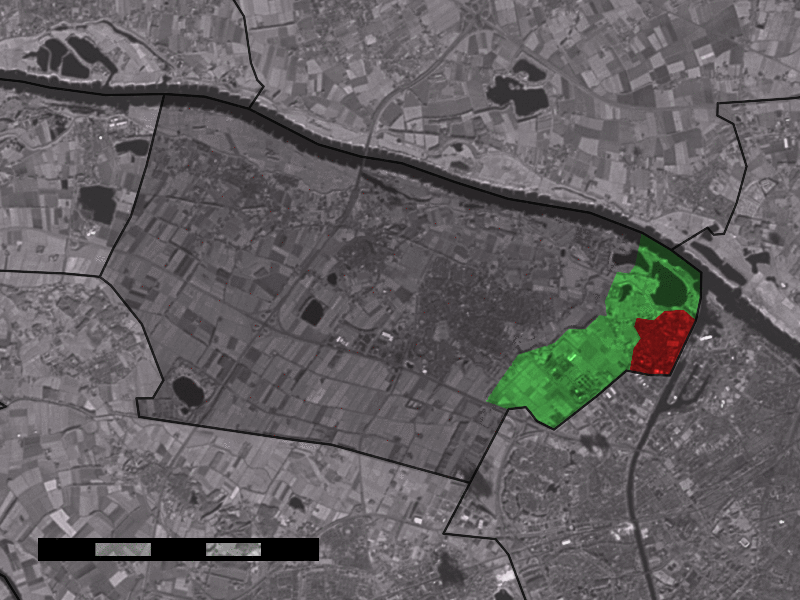
- The village (red) and the statistical district (light green) of Weurt in the municipality of Beuningen.

- Location in the province of Gelderland in the Netherlands Weurt (Netherlands)
- Coordinates: 51°51′N 5°49′E
- Country: Netherlands
- Province: Gelderland
- Municipality: Beuningen

Area
  - Total: 4.68 km^{2} (1.81 sq mi)
- Elevation: 11 m (36 ft)

Population (2021)
  - Total: 2,490
  - Density: 532/km^{2} (1,380/sq mi)
- Time zone: UTC+1 (CET)
  - Summer (DST): UTC+2 (CEST)
- Postal code: 6551
- Dialing code: 024
- Website: beuningen.nl

Weurt (Dutch pronunciation: [ʋøːrt]) is a village in the Dutch province of Gelderland. It is a part of the municipality of Beuningen, and lies about 0.1 km West of Nijmegen.

Weurt was a separate municipality until 1818, when it was merged with Beuningen.

It was first mentioned in 1148 as Vurdene, and means "land near water". Weurt developed along the Waal River. In 1840, it was home to 451 people.

A large brickworks resulted in a population increase. The 1837 church became too small, and was replaced by the St Andrews Church which was completed in 1898. After World War II, the village was extended southwards, and now borders the industrial area of Nijmegen.

== Gallery ==
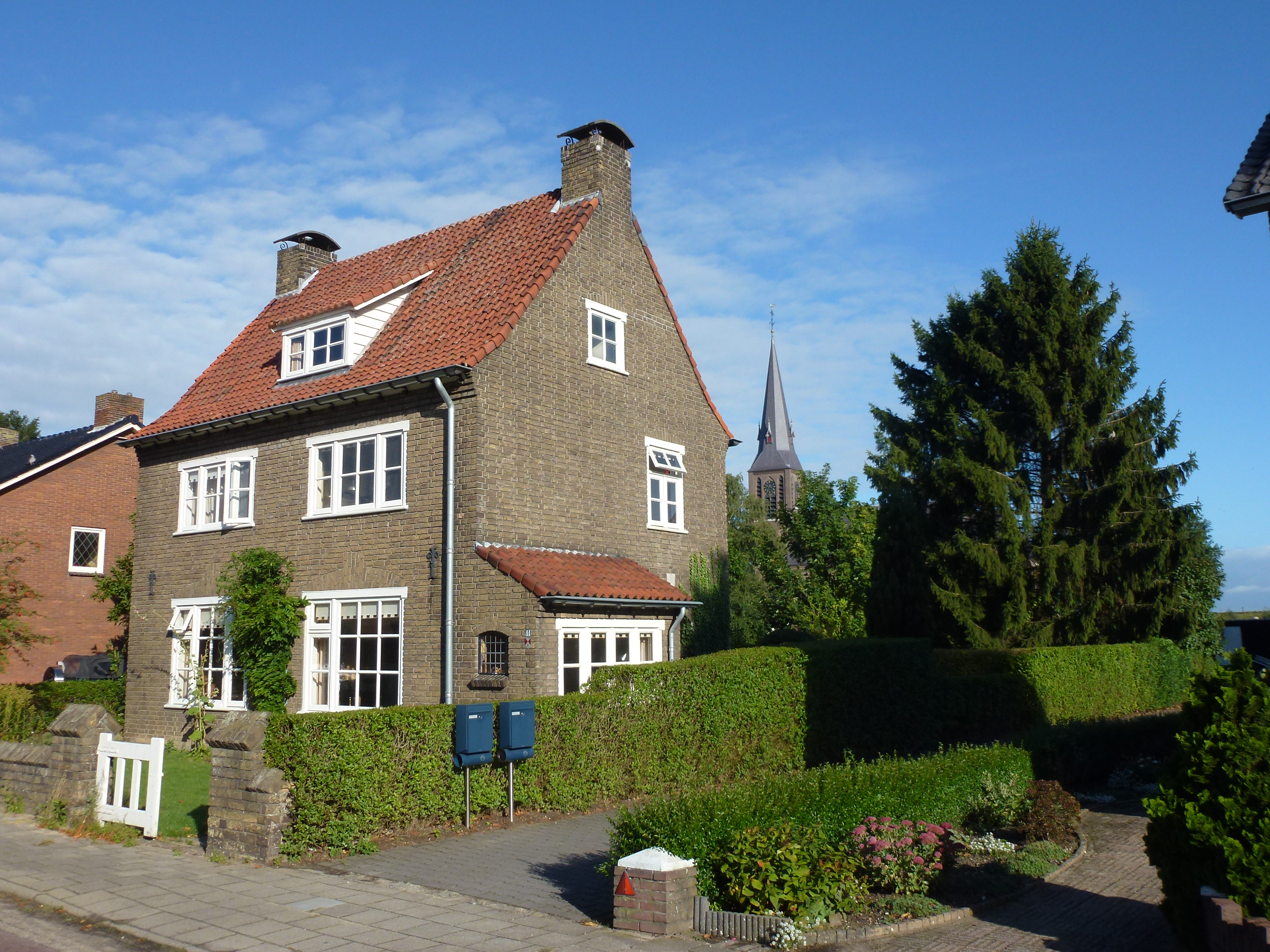
House in Weurt

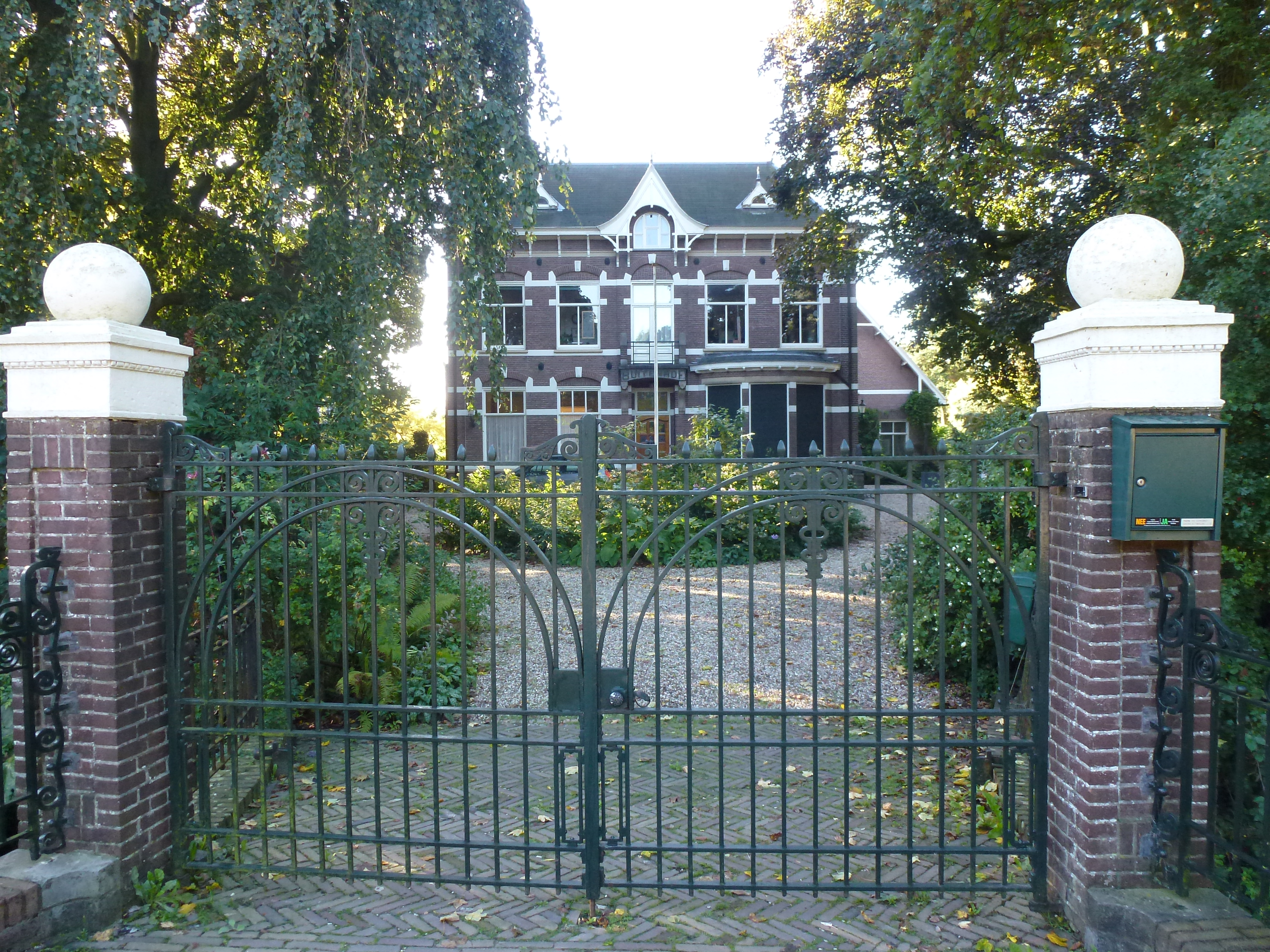
Villa Buitenhof

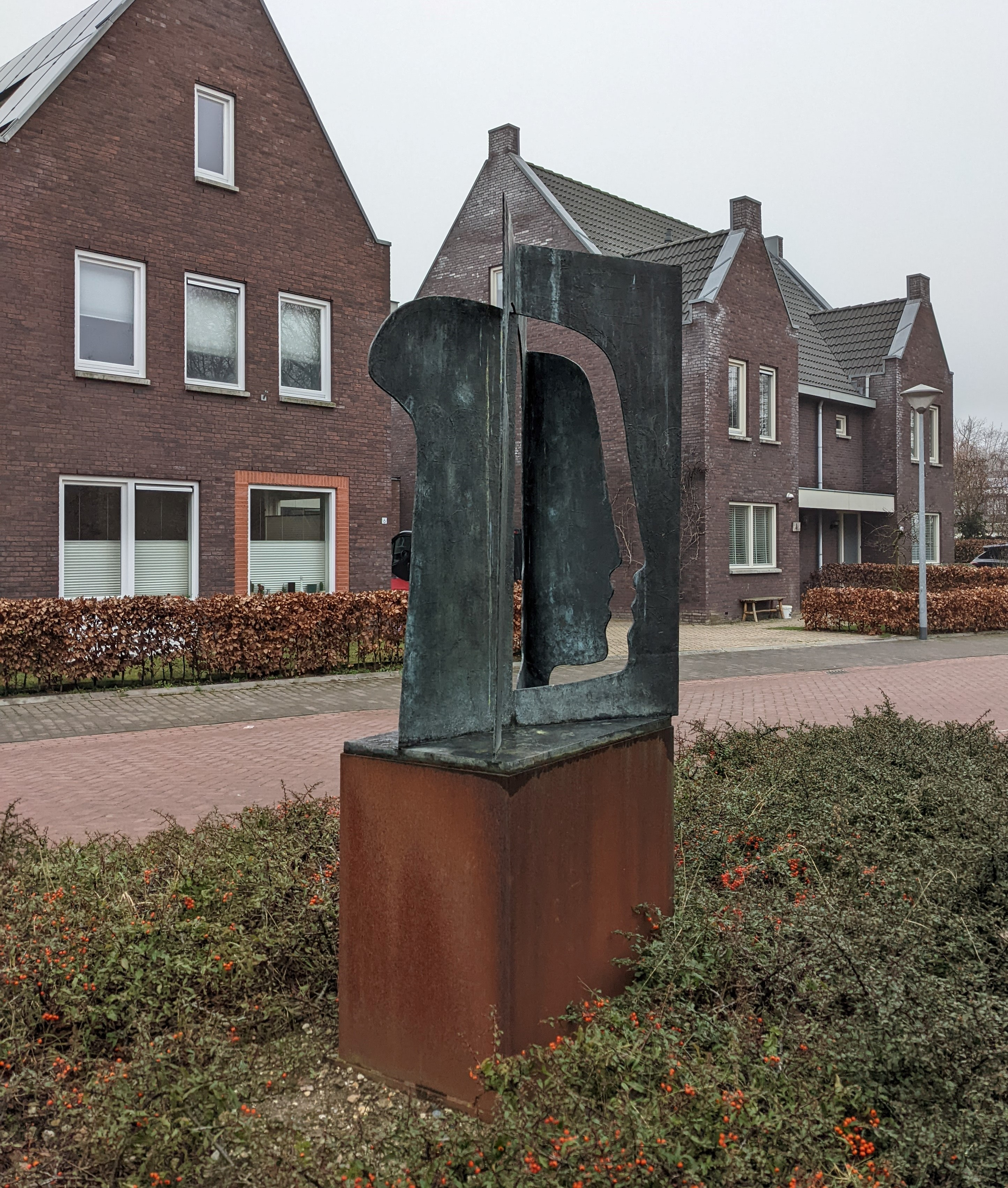
Femmeke by Ad Merx
