= Bas van Bemmelen =

Dutch volleyball player (born 1989)

Personal information
- Nationality: Dutch
- Born: 18 August 1989 (age 37); Beuningen
- Height: 207 cm (6 ft 9 in)
- Weight: 92 kg (203 lb)
- Spike: 350 cm (138 in)
- Block: 336 cm (132 in)

Volleyball information
- Position: middle blocker
- Number: 8 (national team)

Career
Years	Teams
2015	(Belgium) Topvolley Precura Antwerpen

National team
2013-	Netherlands

Sebastiaan "Bas" van Bemmelen (born 18 August 1989) is a Dutch male volleyball player. He is part of the Netherlands men's national volleyball team. He competed at the 2013 Men's European Volleyball Championship and 2015 Men's European Volleyball Championship. On club level he plays for Topvolley Precura Antwerpen in Belgium.
