= Werner Baake =

German fighter ace and Knight's Cross recipient (1918–1964)

- Born: 1 November 1918; Nordhausen, German Empire
- Died: 15 July 1964 (aged 45); Heilsbronn, West Germany
- Military career
- Allegiance: Nazi Germany
- Branch: Luftwaffe
- Service years: 1939–1945
- Rank: Hauptmann (captain)
- Unit: NJG 1
- Commands: 2./NJG 1, I./NJG 1
- Conflicts: World War II: Defense of the Reich
- Awards: Knight's Cross of the Iron Cross
- Other work: Pilot for Lufthansa

Werner Baake (1 November 1918 in Nordhausen, Germany – 15 July 1964) was a night fighter pilot fighter ace and recipient of the Knight's Cross of the Iron Cross who served in the Nazi German Luftwaffe during World War II. The Knight's Cross of the Iron Cross, and its variants were the highest awards in the military and paramilitary forces of Nazi Germany during World War II. Baake claimed 41 nocturnal aerial victories in 195 combat missions. He was the 36th most successful night fighter ace of World War II, and of aerial warfare. Baake's total surpassed that of all Allied night fighter pilots; Branse Burbridge being the highest.

== Career ==
Baake was born on 1 November 1918 in Nordhausen, at the time in Thuringia of the German Empire. Following flight training, (Note: Flight training in the Luftwaffe progressed through the levels A1, A2 and B1, B2, referred to as A/B flight training. A training included theoretical and practical training in aerobatics, navigation, long-distance flights and dead-stick landings. The B courses included high-altitude flights, instrument flights, night landings and training to handle the aircraft in difficult situations. For pilots destined to fly multi-engine aircraft, the training was completed with the Luftwaffe Advanced Pilot's Certificate (Erweiterter Luftwaffen-Flugzeugführerschein), also known as the C-Certificate.) Baake was posted to I. Gruppe of Nachtjagdgeschwader 1 (NJG 1), based at Gilze-Rijen, Netherlands on 21 November 1942. The unit was involved in so-called Reichsverteidigung ("Defence of the Reich") operations.

=== Night fighter career ===
A map of part of the Kammhuber Line. The 'belt' and night fighter 'boxes' are shown.

Following the 1939 aerial Battle of the Heligoland Bight, bombing missions by the Royal Air Force (RAF) shifted to the cover of darkness, initiating the Defence of the Reich campaign. By mid-1940, Generalmajor (Brigadier General) Josef Kammhuber had established a night air defense system dubbed the Kammhuber Line. It consisted of a series of control sectors equipped with radars and searchlights and an associated night fighter. Each sector, named a Himmelbett (canopy bed), would direct the night fighter into visual range with target bombers. In 1941, the Luftwaffe started equipping night fighters with airborne radar such as the Lichtenstein radar. This airborne radar did not come into general use until early 1942.

It took Baake nearly seven months to make a claim, and by the time he did so, he had been promoted to Leutnant (Second Lieutenant). At the height of the Battle of the Ruhr, a concerted bomber offensive conducted by RAF Bomber Command, Baake achieved his first success. In the early hours of 2 June 1943, north of Neeroeteren, he claimed a Vickers Wellington bomber shot down at 01:10. Baake remained airborne for nearly two hours before engaging and claiming a Handley-Page Halifax shot down northwest of Gorinchem at 02:43. Baake's third victory was achieved at 00:59 hours on 17 June near "Vechel" (possibly Veghel). This time the enemy bomber was identified as an Avro Lancaster. The machine, ED629, "PH-K", was from No. 12 Squadron RAF. All of the crew – Sergeants Arthur Charles Aylard, J. Scott, T. Alexander, M. R. Williams, H. J. P. Lackey, J. W. N. Westlake and R. Swain – were killed. (Note: According to the Aviation Safety Network, the aircraft shot down was Lancaster W4901 from No. 103 Squadron RAF.)

On 22 June Baake claimed a Wellington southwest of Bergeyk at 01:30 and then accounted for a Halifax northeast of the town at 01:37. The successes put his total at five for which qualified him for night fighter ace.

In the early hours of 23 June, Baake claimed three victories. These included two Lancasters, at 00:55 and 1:30, near south-east Utrecht and west of Nijmegen respectively. Sergeant E. A Williams of 101 Sqn was the sole survivor from one of these Lancasters (LM325; "SR-J"). (Sgt R. A. Waterhouse, Sgt J. Osborne, Pilot Officer (P/O) T. Tomkins, Sgt E. Smith, Sgt V Sugden and Sgt R. Cooper were killed.) Baake's third victim that night was a Halifax Mk V (DK224; MP-Q) of 76 Squadron, north-west of Utrecht at 01:58. The crew bailed out and there was one fatality among them, Sgt R. Huke (flight engineer). The station commander of RAF Holme-on-Spalding Moor, Group Captain Douglas Wilson Royal Australian Air Force (RAAF), who was acting as second pilot of the Halifax, was apprehended by the Gestapo in Paris several weeks later and became a prisoner of war (POW)).

At 01:10 on 25 June 1943, Baake shot down another Wellington at Kerkdriel for his ninth victory. Baake achieved his tenth victory at 01:30 on 14 July, northwest of Utrecht. It was last during the RAF's Ruhr offensive. This aircraft was probably Halifax HR720, WP-B, of No. 158 Squadron RAF crewed by: G. R. J. Duthie Royal New Zealand Air Force (pilot, killed); J. N. Hempstead (flight engineer, evaded capture); F.D. Granger (navigator, became a POW); T. E. F. Carr (bomb-aimer, POW); G. H. King (wireless operator, POW); J. R. Grey Royal Australian Air Force (gunner, POW); and T. Pinkney (gunner, POW).

At 02:18 on 24 August, Baake claimed a Lancaster southeast of Wittenburg as Bomber Command attacked Berlin and he claimed two Short Stirling bombers on 28 August, west of Augsburg at 02:10 and northwest of Nuremberg at 02:15. One was Stirling III EE942 QS-R from No. 620 Squadron RAF flown by Flight Lieutenant John Francis Nichols. The aircraft came down at Halbersdorf, Mainz. None of the crew survived. On the night of 31 August another two Halifax bombers were claimed at 23:25 and 23:30 northeast of Lemgo and Neu-Rebstock to bring his tally to 15. In September 1943 he claimed four bombers: three Lancasters and a Halifax; one on 1 September at 0:59 near Wustermark, two on 6 September at 00:15 and scoring the last victory for the Luftwaffe that night at 02:00 over Kaiserslautern. At 22:40 north of Quakenbrück on 27 September, Baake achieved his 19th victory.

On 3 November 1943 two Lancasters were shot down near Helmond and Essen at 19:13 and 19:36. One of the Lancasters may have been Lancaster I W4822, of No. 57 Squadron RAF, captained by First Lieutenant Donald R. West, United States Army Air Forces (USAAF). West died with four other crew members; three were captured. On 18 November Bomber Command began the Berlin Campaign. On 20 December Baake shot down two Lancasters. The aircraft were reported shot down northwest of Liège, Belgium and Eindhoven, at 19:12 and 21:00 respectively—the last success being the last claim submitted by a night fighter pilot on that operation. On 16 January 1944, Baake was awarded the German Cross in Gold (Deutsches Kreuz in Gold).

=== Squadron leader ===
On 22 January 1944, Baake was appointed Staffelkapitän (squadron leader) of 2. Staffel of NJG 1. He downed his third and last victim during the Berlin campaign on 27 January. He claimed a Lancaster shot down at 22:50 southwest of Aachen. In the engagement, Baake's Messerschmitt Bf 110 G-4 (Werknummer 740062—factory number) collided with the debris of Lancaster DS710 of the Royal Canadian Air Force (RCAF) 408 (Goose) Squadron. While Baake parachuted to safety, his radio operator Unteroffizier Heinz Waldbauer was killed. Baake claimed his 25th victory as Bomber Command attacked Aachen on the night of 11/12 April 1944. He claimed a Lancaster west of Haarlem at 23:37. Nine claims were made over Germany that night plus two claims made over England. Bomber Command lost nine.

On the night of 24/25 April Munich and Karlsruhe were targeted. Baake achieved two interceptions resulting in the destruction of a Lancaster north of Tilburg at 00:26, and a Halifax west of Gorinchem at 02:18. Baake's 28th victory was attained on 4 May at 00:20 west of Venlo. He shot down Boeing B-17 Flying Fortress M-Mother of No. 78 Squadron RAF that had been by ground fire in the target area but was intercepted and finished off by Baake. It was piloted by Flight Lieutenant J. G Smith; Smith and one crew member evaded capture but the others, including American expatriate and former USAAF officer, Sergeant W. Heubner, were captured. On 6/7 May Baake shot down another B-17 west of Venlo at 00:09, having claimed a de Havilland Mosquito at 23:25—his first and only victory against that type. The two claims made his personal total 30. Only Baake claimed a Mosquito on 6/7 May. Bomber Command records show that one belonging to No. 109 Squadron RAF was lost participating in a raid on Leverkusen.

On 12 and 23 May 1944, at 0:42 and 1:14 respectively, Baake shot down a Lancaster; to take his total to 32. The former victory was over Lancaster JB733 of No. 103 Squadron RAF, which crashed at Hallaar, northeast of Antwerp after Baake fatally damaged it over Huckhofen. Pilot Officer R. Whitley; Sergeant K. L. Ramage; Warrant Officer J. A. Carter Royal Canadian Air Force; Flight Sergeant R. B. Webb; Sergeant P. N. Crutchfield; Sergeant J. W. Smith; and Sergeant K. M. Martin were all killed. Baake claimed a Halifax on 17 June 1944 and two Lancasters on 22 June, west of Aachen for his 33rd, 34th and 35th air victories. On 27 July, Baake received the Knight's Cross of the Iron Cross (Ritterkreuz des Eisernen Kreuzes).

=== Group commander ===
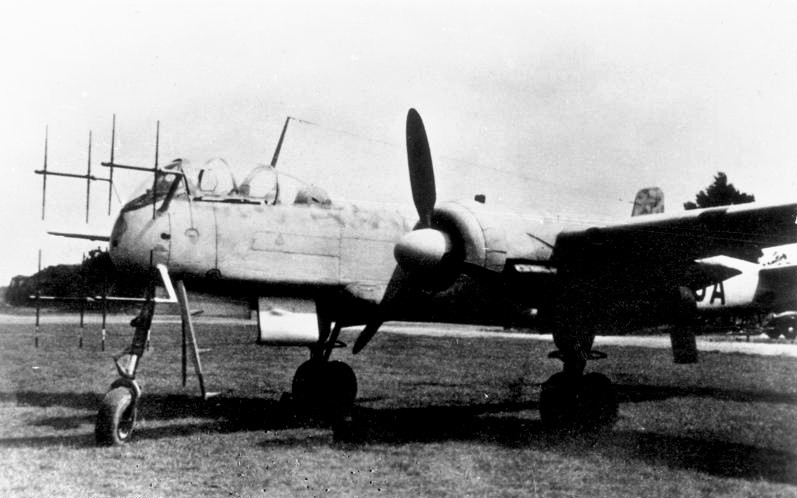
Heinkel He 219

On 2 October 1944, Aders was appointed Gruppenkommandeur (group commander) of I. Gruppe of NJG 1, succeeding Major Paul Förster in this capacity. The RAF Bomber Command targeted Bochum on 9 October. Following the intercept mission, Baake was forced to make a belly landing in his Heinkel He 219 A-0 (Werknummer 190233) because the landing gear failed to lower, damaging the aircraft. On 4 and 6 November, Baake filed single claims for a Lancaster destroyed. On 24 December Baake claimed another Lancaster over western Germany as Bomber Command targeted rail junctions to disrupt German Army supplies during the German Ardennes Offensive. Baake's last claims came on the evening of 5 January 1945, when he downed a trio of Halifax bombers—two near Emden and another near Hannover.

Werner Baake did not claim another bomber in the last four months of the war. On the night of 18/19 March 1945, Baake narrowly avoided being killed when he was shot down in a He 219 by a Mosquito night fighter flown by night fighter ace Walter Gibb, commander of No. 239 Squadron RAF.

== After the war ==
After the war, Baake worked as a pilot for the West German airline Lufthansa. He was killed on 15 July 1964, when his Boeing 720 registration D-ABOP crashed near Ansbach during a training flight after he performed an unauthorised aerobatic manoeuvre. Following a successful barrel roll, the crew attempted a second. During this the aircraft broke apart due to structural overloading and all three members of the crew were killed.

== Summary of career ==
=== Aerial victory claims ===
According to Spick, Baake was credited with 41 aerial victories, claimed in 195 combat missions. Obermaier also lists him with 41 nocturnal aerial victories claimed in 195 combat missions. His 41 aerial victory claims include 37 four-engined bombers and one Mosquito. Foreman, Parry and Mathews, authors of Luftwaffe Night Fighter Claims 1939 – 1945, researched the German Federal Archives and found records for 43 nocturnal victory claims. Mathews and Foreman also published Luftwaffe Aces — Biographies and Victory Claims, also listing Baake with 43 claims.

Chronicle of aerial victories
Claim	Date	Time	Type	Location	Serial No./Squadron No.
– 1. Staffel of Nachtjagdgeschwader 1 –
1	12 June 1943	01:10	Wellington	1 km (0.62 mi) northeast of Neeroeteren	Wellington HZ355/429 (Bomber) Squadron RCAF
2	12 June 1943	02:43	Halifax	5 km (3.1 mi) north Gorinchem	Halifax JB785/No. XXXV (Madras Presidency) Squadron
3	17 June 1943	00:59	Lancaster	Neerpelt (Belgium)	Lancaster W4901/No. 103 Squadron RAF
4	22 June 1943	01:30	Wellington	3 km (1.9 mi) southwest Bergeyk	Wellington HZ520/429 (Bomber) Squadron RCAF
5	22 June 1943	01:37	Halifax	5 km (3.1 mi) north northeast Bergeyk	Halifax HR848/No. XXXV (Madras Presidency) Squadron
6	23 June 1943	00:55	Lancaster	15 km (9.3 mi) east southeast Utrecht	
7	23 June 1943	01:38	Lancaster	3 km (1.9 mi) west Nijmegen	Lancaster LM325/No. 101 Squadron RAF
8	23 June 1943	01:58	Halifax	6 km (3.7 mi) northwest Utrecht	Halifax DK224/No. 76 Squadron RAF
9	25 June 1943	01:10	Wellington	Driel	Wellington HF572/No. 432 Squadron RCAF
10	14 July 1943	01:30	Halifax	3 km (1.9 mi) northwest Utrecht	
11	24 August 1943	02:18	Avro Lancaster Mk II	20 km (12 mi) west Castricum aan zee	Little Snoring DS722/No. 115 Squadron RAF
12	28 August 1943	02:10	Stirling	20 km (12 mi) northwest Nuremberg	Stirling EE942/No. 620 Squadron RAF
13	28 August 1943	02:15	Stirling	20 km (12 mi) northwest Nuremberg	
– 3. Staffel of Nachtjagdgeschwader 1 –
14	31 August 1943	23:25	Halifax	northeast Lemgo	Halifax JD331/No. 419 Bomber Squadron RCAF
15	31 August 1943	23:30	Halifax	Neu-Rebstock	
16	1 September 1943	00:59	Lancaster	Wustermark	
17	6 September 1943	00:15	Halifax	8 km (5.0 mi) east Germersheim	Halifax HR874/No. 78 Squadron RAF
18	6 September 1943	02:00	Lancaster	5 km (3.1 mi) east Kaiserslautern	Halifax LW229/No. 78 Squadron RAF
19	27 September 1943	22:40	Lancaster	4 km (2.5 mi) north Quakenbrück	Lancaster JA849/No. 7 Squadron RAF
20	3 November 1943	19:13	Lancaster	east Antwerp	Lancaster JB121/No. 467 Squadron RAAF
21	3 November 1943	19:36	Lancaster	north Hasselt	
22	20 December 1943	19:00	Lancaster	northeast Liège	
23	20 December 1943	21:00	Halifax	northwest Eindhoven	Halifax JN974/No. 78 Squadron RAF
– 2. Staffel of Nachtjagdgeschwader 1 –
24	27 January 1944	22:50	Lancaster	16 km (9.9 mi) southwest Aachen	Lancaster DS710/408 (Goose) Squadron.
25	11 April 1944	23:37	Lancaster	100 km (62 mi) west Haarlem	
26	25 April 1944	00:26	Lancaster	north of Loop op Zand-Tilburh	
27	25 April 1944	02:18	Halifax	west Gorinchem	
28	4 May 1944	00:20	B-17	50 km (31 mi) west Venlo	
29	6 May 1944	23:35	Mosquito	1 km (0.62 mi) northeast Melick en Herkenbosch	Mosquito ML958/No. 109 Squadron RAF
30	7 May 1944	00:09	B-17	west Venlo	
31	12 May 1944	00:42	Lancaster	28 km (17 mi) northeast Huckhofen	Lancaster JB733/No. 103 Squadron RAF
32	23 May 1944	01:14	Lancaster	southwest Neerpelt	
33	17 June 1944	01:10	Halifax	Eindhoven	Halifax MZ698/No. 77 Squadron RAF
34	22 June 1944	01:22	Lancaster	west Aachen	
35	22 June 1944	01:46	Lancaster	west Aachen	
– Stab I. Gruppe of Nachtjagdgeschwader 1 –
36	4 November 1944	19:36	Halifax	8 km (5.0 mi) northwest Mettingen	Lancaster NE133/No. 463 Squadron RAAF
37	6 November 1944	19:23	Lancaster	12 km (7.5 mi) southeast Doetinchem	Lancaster LM628/No. 50 Squadron RAF
38	24 December 1944	18:50	Lancaster		Lancaster NF915/No. 622 Squadron RAF
39	5 January 1945	19:05	Halifax	50 km (31 mi) north Emden	
40	5 January 1945	19:12	Halifax	80 km (50 mi) north Emden	
41	5 January 1945	19:44	Halifax	50 km (31 mi) west Hanover	
42	3 February 1945	20:07	Lancaster	15 km (9.3 mi) northeast of Aachen	
43	7 March 1945	20:17	Lancaster	20 km (12 mi) northwest of Boxmeer	

=== Awards ===
- Front Flying Clasp of the Luftwaffe
- Iron Cross (1939) 2nd and 1st Class
- Honour Goblet of the Luftwaffe (Ehrenpokal der Luftwaffe) on 6 September 1943 as Leutnant and pilot
- German Cross in Gold on 16 January 1944 as Oberleutnant in 3./Nachtjagdgeschwader 1
- Knight's Cross of the Iron Cross on 27 July 1944 as Oberleutnant and Staffelkapitän of 2./Nachtjagdgeschwader 1 (Note: According to Fellgiebel as Staffelkapitän of 3./Nachtjagdgeschwader 1.)

== See also ==
- List of accidents and incidents involving airliners by airline (D–O)

== Notes ==
Military offices
Preceded by Major Paul Förster	Commander of I. Gruppe of Nachtjagdgeschwader 1; 2 October 1944 – 8 May 1945	Succeeded by None
