= De Haag, Beuningen =

Dutch windmill

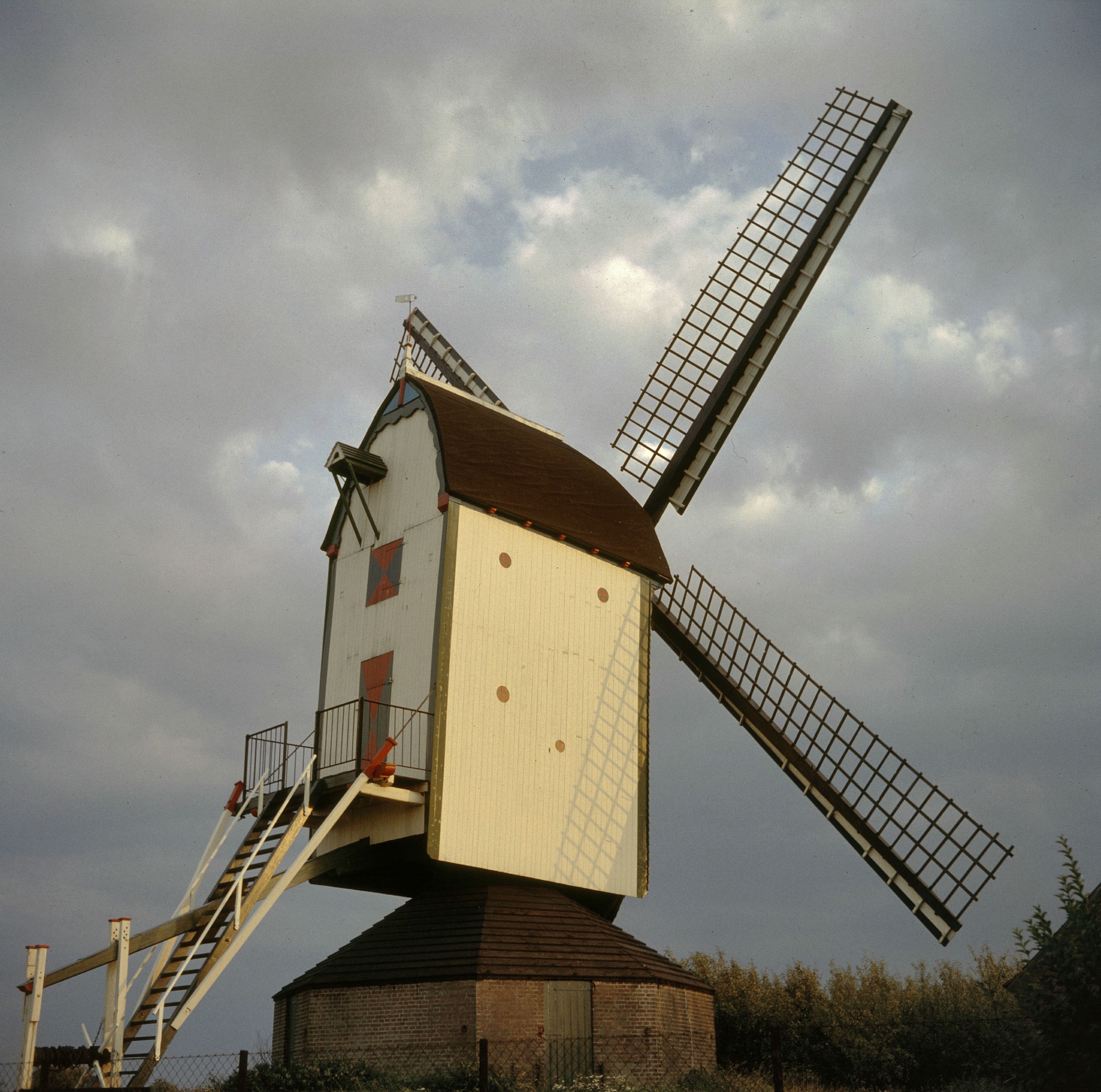
- The mill in 1964

Origin
- Mill name: De Haag
- Mill location: Molenstraat 54M, 6641 BK, Beuningen
- Coordinates: 51°51′38″N 5°46′37″E
- Operator: Gemeente Beuingen
- Year built: 1704

Information
- Purpose: Corn mill
- Type: Post mill
- Roundhouse storeys: One storey roundhouse
- No. of sails: Four sails
- Type of sails: Common sails
- Windshaft: Cast iron
- Winding: Tailpole and winch
- Auxiliary power: Formerly a steam engine
- No. of pairs of millstones: Two pairs
- Size of millstones: One pair 1.40 metres (4 ft 7 in) diameter, one pair 1.30 metres (4 ft 3 in) diameter

De Haag (English: The Hedge) is a post mill in Beuningen, Gelderland, Netherlands which was built in 1706 and has been restored to working order. The mill is listed as a Rijksmonument.

== History ==
A mill has stood in Beuningen since 1382. The previous mill was blown down c.1704 and De Haag was built to replace it. The mill was in the ownership of the De Pol family from 1825 to 1982. From 1900, a steam engine was used to provide auxiliary power, it being mentioned frequently in advertisements in De Molenaar. The mill stopped working by wind c.1940. The mill was restored in 1953, with some second-hand sails being fitted. Despite advertising in De Molenaar for a miller, no-one could be found to work the mill and it remained idle. In 1982, the mill was sold to the Gemeente Beuingen. The mill was completely rebuilt and moved to a new site 12 metres (13 yd) away. It was officially reopened on 4 November 1994 and has since been regularly worked. It is listed as a Rijksmonument, № 9536.

== Description ==
The mill is what the Dutch describe as a "Standerdmolen". It is a post mill with a single storey octagonal roundhouse. The roof of the mill is covered in dakleer. The mill is winded by tailpole and winch. The sails are Common sails. They have a span of 22.50 metres (73 ft 10 in). The sails are carried on a cast iron windshafthead, which was cast by Smulder of Utrecht at a wooden windshaft. The wooden windshaft also carries the wooden brake wheel which has teeth on the front and rear faces. The front face of the brake wheel has 65 teeth. It drives a pair of 1.60 metres (5 ft 3 in) diameter Cullen millstones via a lantern pinion stone nut which has 12 staves. The rear face of the brake wheel has 59 teeth. It drives a pair of 1.50 metres (4 ft 11 in) French Burr millstones via a lantern pinion stone nut which has 11 staves. With this arrangement, the millstones are driven in opposite directions.

== Public access ==
De Haag is open on Saturdays between 09:00 and 16:00. It is also open whenever it is working, or by appointment.
