= Lancaster Memorial (Netherlands) =

Lancaster memorial, Beuningen
- Lancastermonument
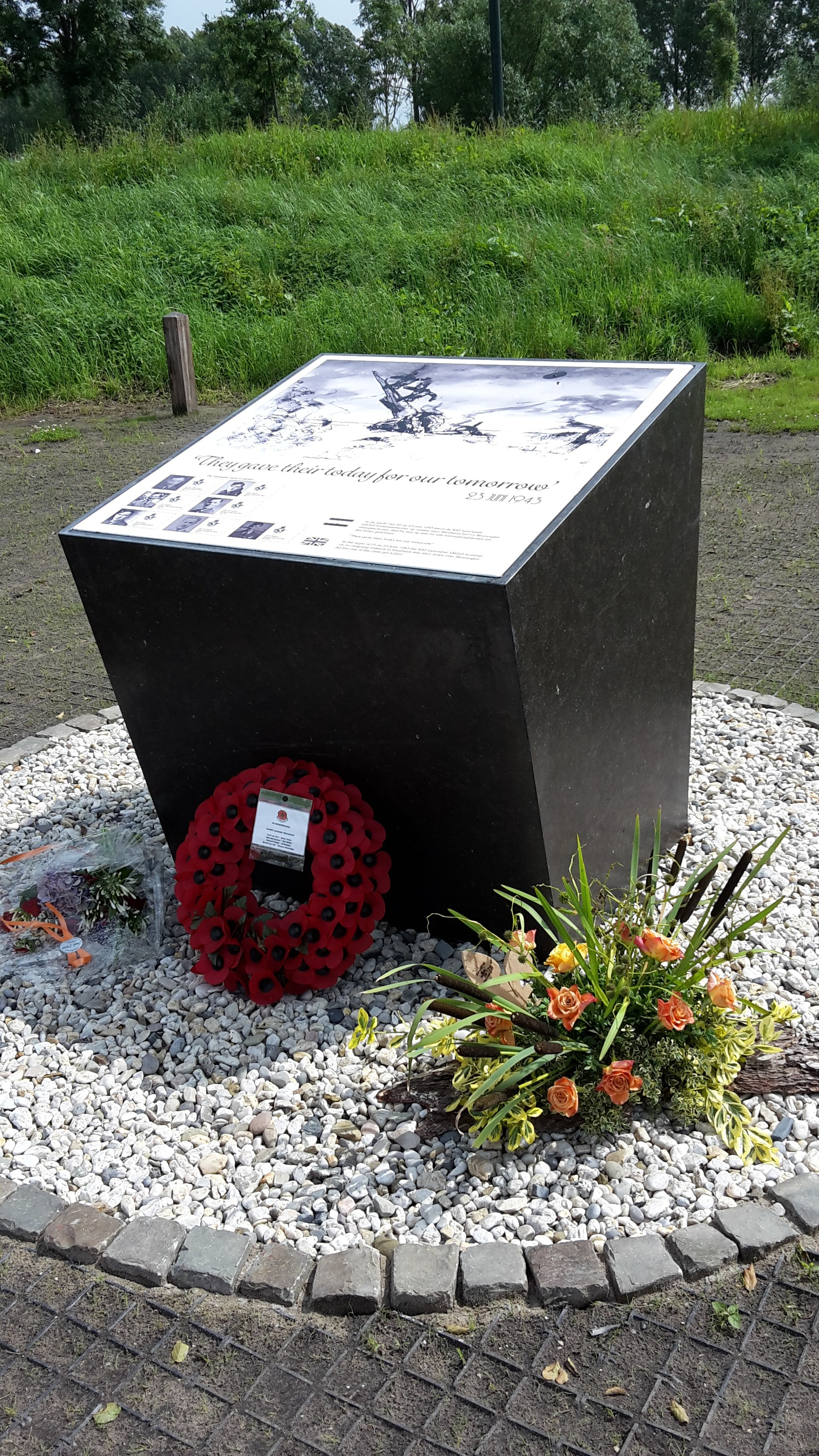
- The memorial, a few days after it was unveiled
- Interactive map of Lancaster memorial, Beuningen
- Location: Beuningen, Netherlands
- Coordinates: 51°50′46.6″N 5°45′14.3″E
- Designer: Hein van Houten
- Material: Steel, bluestone
- Length: 1.00 metre (3.28 ft)
- Width: 1.00 metre (3.28 ft)
- Height: 1.15 metres (3.8 ft)
- Opening date: 23 June 2016
- Dedicated to: LM325 crew

The Lancaster Memorial in Beuningen, Netherlands is a memorial that commemorates the crew of the British Avro Lancaster LM325 SR-J that crashed on the spot during the night of 22 to 23 June 1943 in World War II. The bomber belonged to the No. 101 Squadron of the RAF. Six of the seven crew lost their lives.

== Background ==
The Lancaster was part of a formation of 557 planes that were heading to the Ruhrgebied for a large-scale attack on the war industry around the German city of Mülheim. Two-thirds of Mülheim was estimated to be destroyed in this attack. The plane took off during the night of 22 June 1943 from the RAF Ludford Magna airbase in Lincolnshire. Its crew consisted of seven airmen:

- Sgt. Jack Osborne, flight engineer, 21 years old
- Sgt. Ted Williams, bomb aimer (POW)
- Sgt. Ron Cooper, mid upper gunner, 20 years old
- Sgt. Vin Sugden, rear gunner, 21 years old
- Flight Officer Beavan Tomkins, navigator, 30 years old
- Sgt. Ted Smith, wireless operator, 22 years old
- Sgt. Roy Waterhouse, pilot, 20 years old.

At 1:38 am on 23 June the plane was intercepted above the village of Beuningen, near the city of Nijmegen, Netherlands by a Messerschmitt Bf 110 night fighter. The Lancaster was hit and caught fire immediately. Heavily burning, it circled a few minutes around Beuningen. The crew managed to drop their bomb load in the fields around the village, preventing the loss of civilian lives. At 1:45 am the plane crashed aside the De Steeg, the road from Beuningen to the neighboring village of Wijchen, 3 km south of the village center. Many people witnessed the incident. The burning wreckage was soon closed off by German soldiers. A Dutch constable also arrived. In his report, he wrote that he saw five crew members and concluded that none of them had survived the crash.

=== The only survivor ===
Ted Williams, the bomb aimer of the plane, survived because he lay horizontally in the nose of the plane, close to the escape hatch. He was able to leave the plane in time and jumped with his parachute. Williams fainted while jumping, and due to the strong wind from the west, he drifted East towards Nijmegen. When he became conscious again, he landed in a garden in the village of Heesch, today a residence area of Nijmegen. He was offered help by the owner of the house and was given medical attention by a doctor for cuts and burn wounds. But soon the Germans found out that Williams had landed in the area, so he was escorted to the local police station and arrested. He was sent as a prisoner of war to Stalag Luft VI near the Polish-Lithuanian border. Williams would remain imprisoned until the end of the war.

Beavan Tomkins also escaped from the plane, but he did not survive the jump. He was found dead in Heesch and was later united with his deceased comrades. The six victims are buried in Uden War Cemetery.

Williams suffered all his life from having been a POW. He could not understand why just he survived. In 1950, he visited Beuningen for a commemorative ceremony. After that he intended to never return. By an extraordinary coincidence, 31 years later on a vacation in Mallorca, he met an old inhabitant from Heesch. That person's family doctor happened to be the doctor that treated Williams for his wounds after his jump. They became close friends, and in 1983 Williams revisited Nijmegen and Beuningen after all. He met, amongst other people, the doctor and owner of the house where he landed at that time. Ted Williams died in 2004.

=== The wreckage ===
The wreckage was later recovered and shredded. Only one propeller has been saved because the part fell off just before the plane hit the ground. It was overlooked by the German soldiers because it was lying in a ditch. The landowner hid the part in a shed and turned it over the municipality after the war.

=== The German pilot ===
The German pilot who shot down Lancaster LM325 was Oberleutnant Werner Baake. He was a member of I. Gruppe (1st group) of Nachtjagdgeschwader 1 (NJG 1—1st Night Fighter Wing) of the German Luftwaffe and was stationed on Gilze-Rijen Air Base. That night he downed two more bombers. During the war Baake flew 195 nightly missions in which he shot down 41 planes. For his actions he was decorated several times by the Nazis. On 2 October 1944 he was promoted to commander of I./NJG 1. After the war he became a civil pilot at the Lufthansa. Eventually he suffered the same fate as the crew members of all the planes that he shot down: Baake died on 15 June 1964 when he crashed in an aircraft accident with a Boeing 720. During a test flight, the crew made a successful barrel-roll, although this was not allowed by the Lufthansa for this kind of airplane. On a second attempt the airplane broke down due to overloading. It crashed near the village of Ansbach. All three crew members including Baake died in the accident.

== The erection of a memorial ==
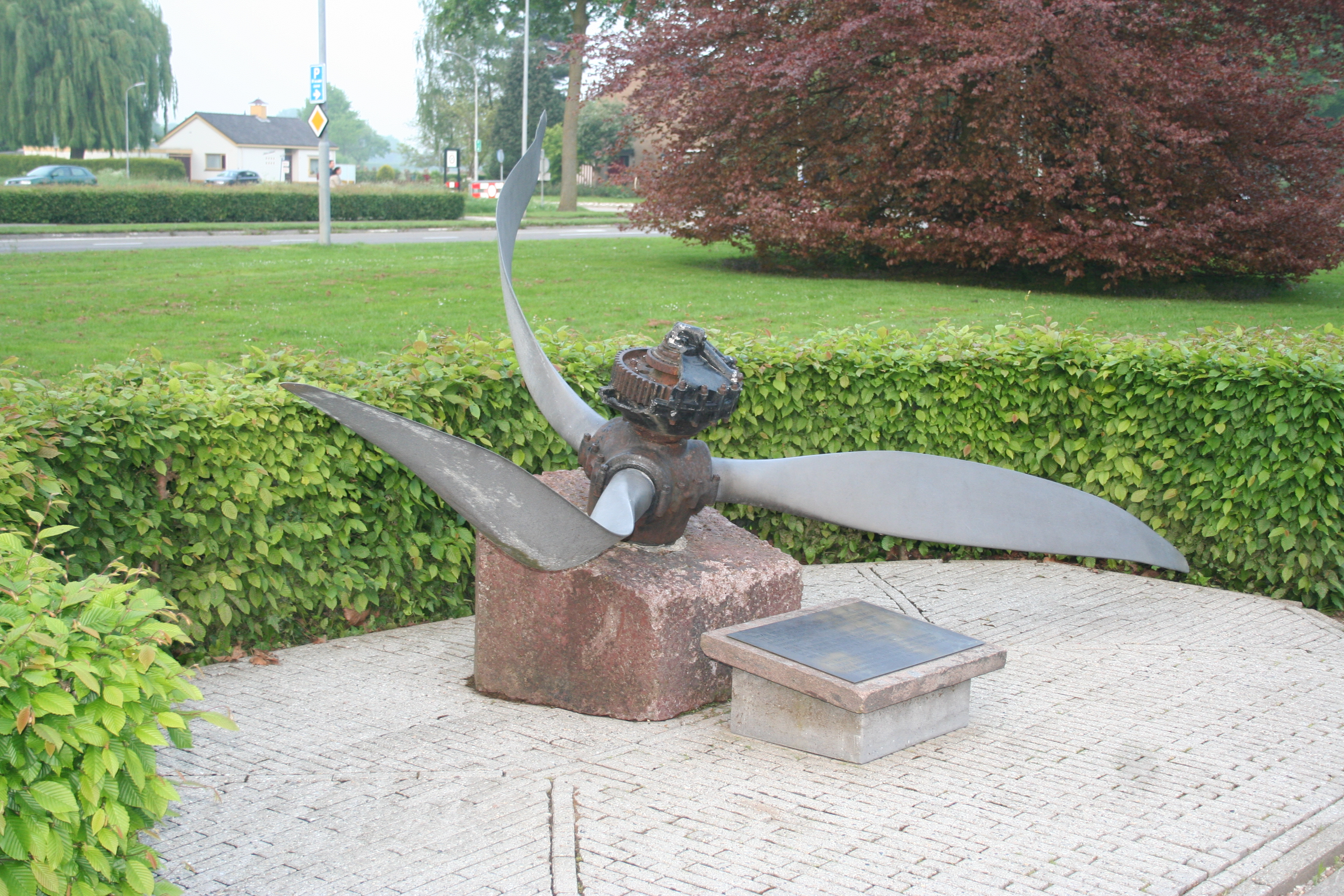
The propeller at its current location near St. Cornelius Church, in 2014

In 1946 a black cross was erected close to the point of impact. During the first years after the war, this was the place where on 4 May the local Remembrance of the Dead was held. People used to walk in a silent march from the town hall to the place of the crash. On 17 September 1950 a memorial for the allied pilots was unveiled in the park next to the town hall. Ted Williams was present at the ceremony as well as ten surviving family of the victims. The propeller of the plane has been processed in the monument. Since then the 4 May remembrance is taking place at this memorial. Due to an extension of the town hall, the memorial was moved to the park next to the St. Cornelius Church in Beuningen in 1984.

In due course of time the crash site came a bit forgotten until in 2013, the local liberation committee took initiative to mark the site with a small sign. It was unveiled in the middle of the night on 1:45 hours, exactly 70 years after the incident. The sign started to serve as a small memorial where annually two remembrances take place. The first is on 4 May, preceding the national and local Remembrance of the Dead. At 18:30 hours there is a ceremony where the crew is honored. Every year on the fourth Wednesday of July, the International Four Days Marches Nijmegen pass through Beuningen. On this day there is a ceremony by soldiers from the British Military who take part in the Marches.

In 2014 the memorial has been adopted by the local Scouting branch. They maintain the memorial and keep the location tidy during the year, and they assist with the organisation of the ceremonies.

Every year the ceremonies and also the 4 May remembrance at the church are visited by more and more people. That is why in 2016 the Scouts and civilians took the initiative in founding a real memorial, together with the municipality. It was unveiled on 23 June 2016 by Ab Bruisten, eyewitness of the crash at the age of 11, and Tim Barlow, grandnephew of flight engineer Jack Osborne.

The memorial has been designed by the artist Hein van Houten.

== Description ==
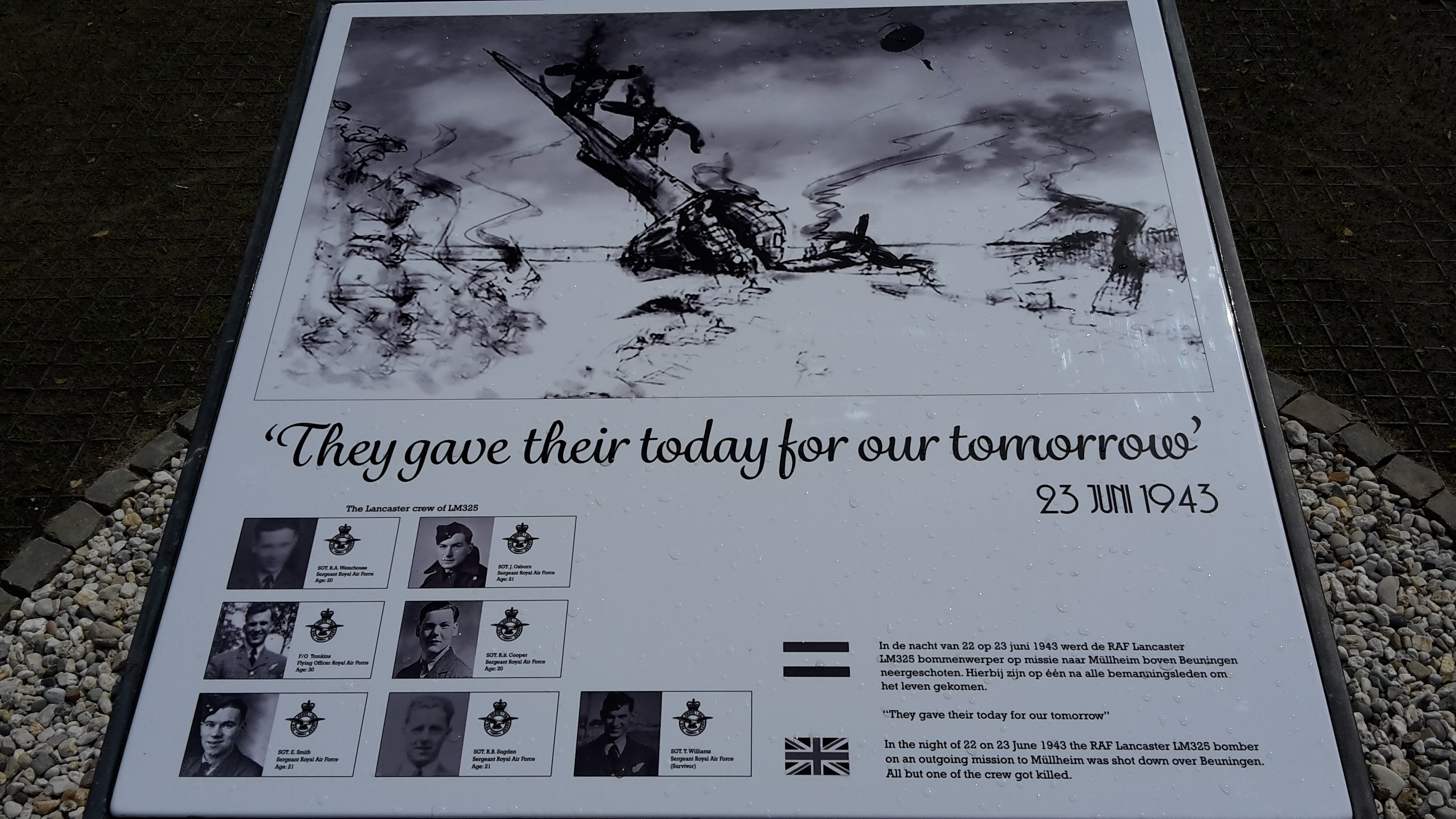
Tablet on the memorial

The memorial is consisting of a bluestone base with an embedded square tablet. On this tablet there is an image made by artist Hein van Houten that is inspired by the eyewitness account of Ab Bruisten. It shows an impression of the crashed airplane and the sole crew member that lands with his parachute. The tablet lists the crew's names and their pictures.

The pedestal is the center of a circle on the ground made from square cobblestones and filled with gravel. Within the Scouting the circle with a dot in the centre "ʘ" is the symbol for 'End of Trail', but also for 'Death'.

The tablet reads:

They gave their today for our tomorrow
23 JUNI 1943

== See also ==
- World War II memorials and cemeteries in the Netherlands
