= Ewijk =

- Village
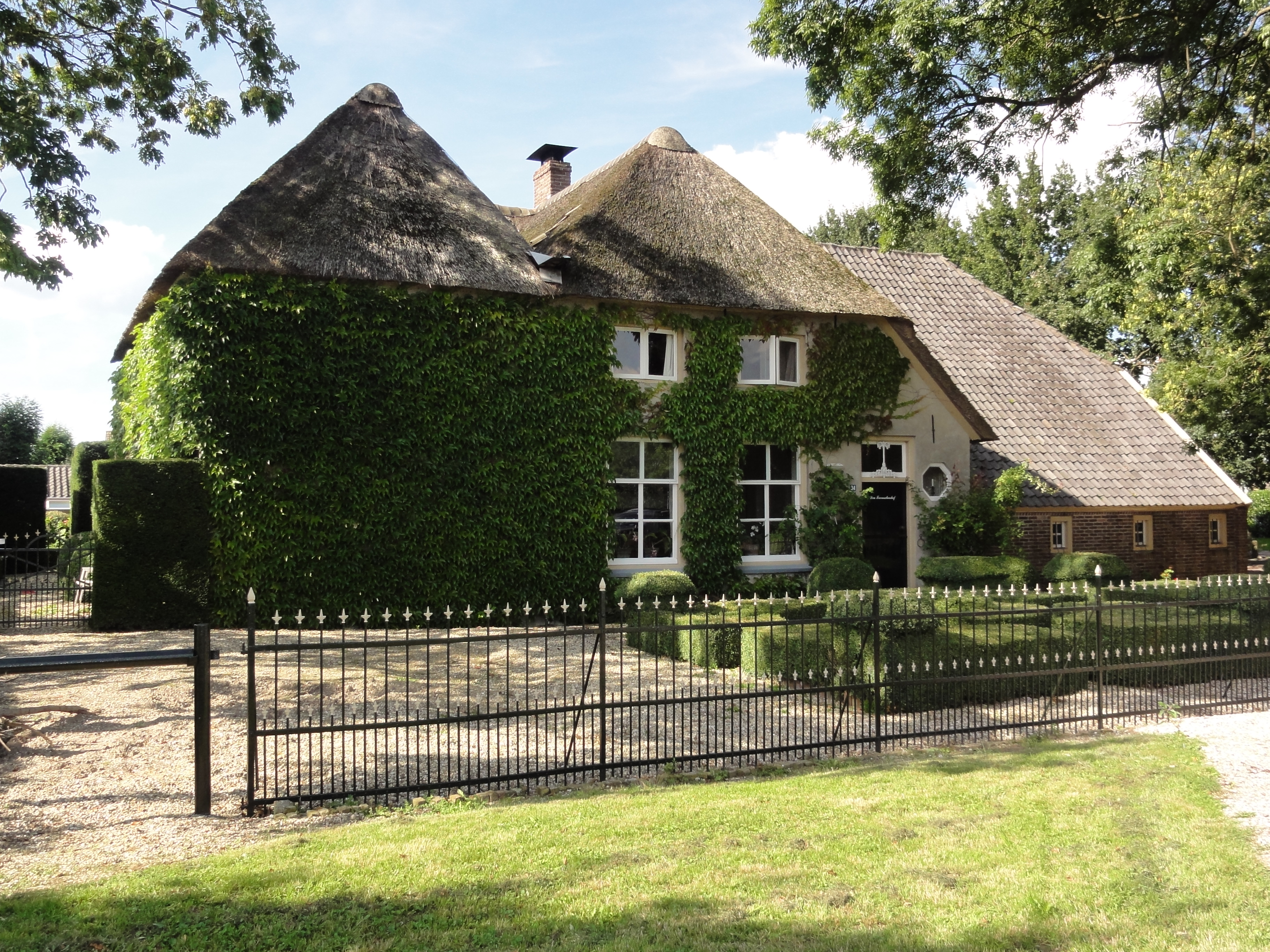
- Farm in Ewijk

- Flag Coat of arms

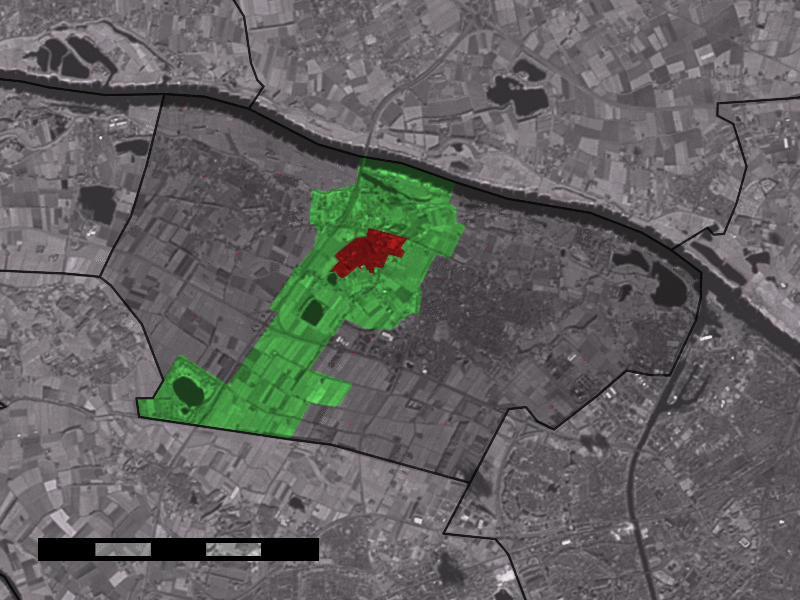
- The village centre (red) and the statistical district (light green) of Ewijk in the municipality of Beuningen.

- Location in the province of Gelderland in the Netherlands Ewijk (Netherlands)
- Coordinates: 51°53′N 5°42′E
- Country: Netherlands
- Province: Gelderland
- Municipality: Beuningen

Area
  - Total: 11.03 km^{2} (4.26 sq mi)
- Elevation: 9 m (30 ft)

Population (2021)
  - Total: 4,410
  - Density: 400/km^{2} (1,040/sq mi)
- Time zone: UTC+1 (CET)
  - Summer (DST): UTC+2 (CEST)
- Postal code: 6644
- Dialing code: 0487

Ewijk (Dutch pronunciation: [ˈeːʋɛi̯k]) is a village in the Dutch province of Gelderland. It is a part of the municipality of Beuningen, and lies about 9 km west of Nijmegen. The river Waal runs in the north.

Ewijk was a separate municipality until 1980, when it was merged with Beuningen.

== History ==
It was first mentioned in 855 as Euuic, and means "neighbourhood near water". Doddendaal is a castle near Ewijk. Part of the wall with corner towers date from the 14th century. The main building was damaged by fire in 1590, and was repaired in the early-17th century. Between 1973 and 1976, it was restored and has become a restaurant. In 1840, it was home to 680 people.

The A50 and A73 motorway meet at Ewijk, and in the late 20th century, the town was mainly known for its daily traffic jams. In 2011, the Tacitusbrug over the Waal was widened from 2x2 to 2x4 lanes.

== Monuments ==
There are 21 Rijksmonuments in Ewijk. Here are a few (in chronological order):

- Old Tower, 12th century
- Doddendael Castle, 14th century
- De Clef Inn, 17th century
- Gable Roof Farm, 1799
- Doddendael Castle Park, ca. 1825
- John the Baptist church, 1916-1917

== Notable people ==
- Susan de Klein (1973–2019), dressage rider

== Gallery ==
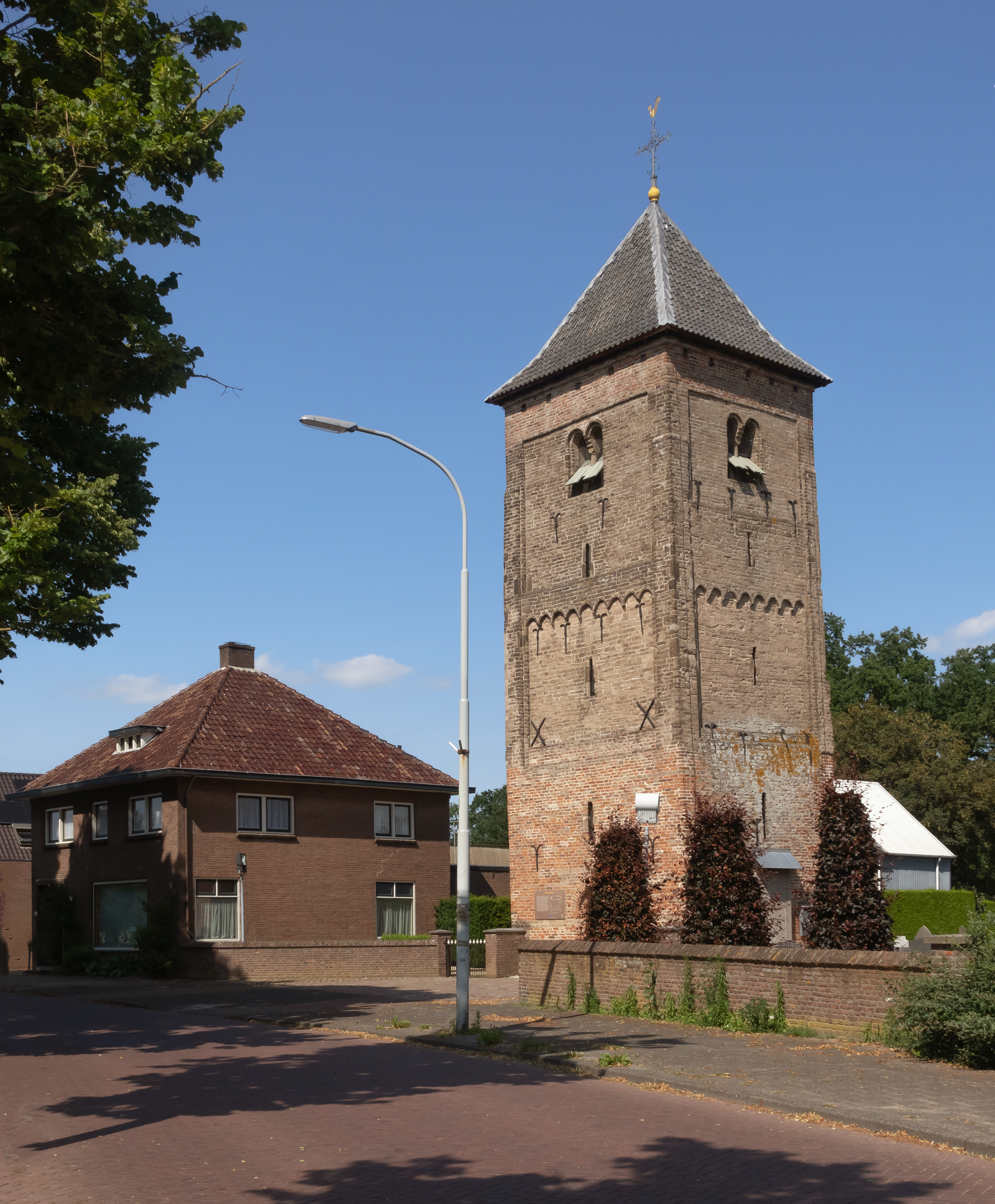
Ewijk, church tower

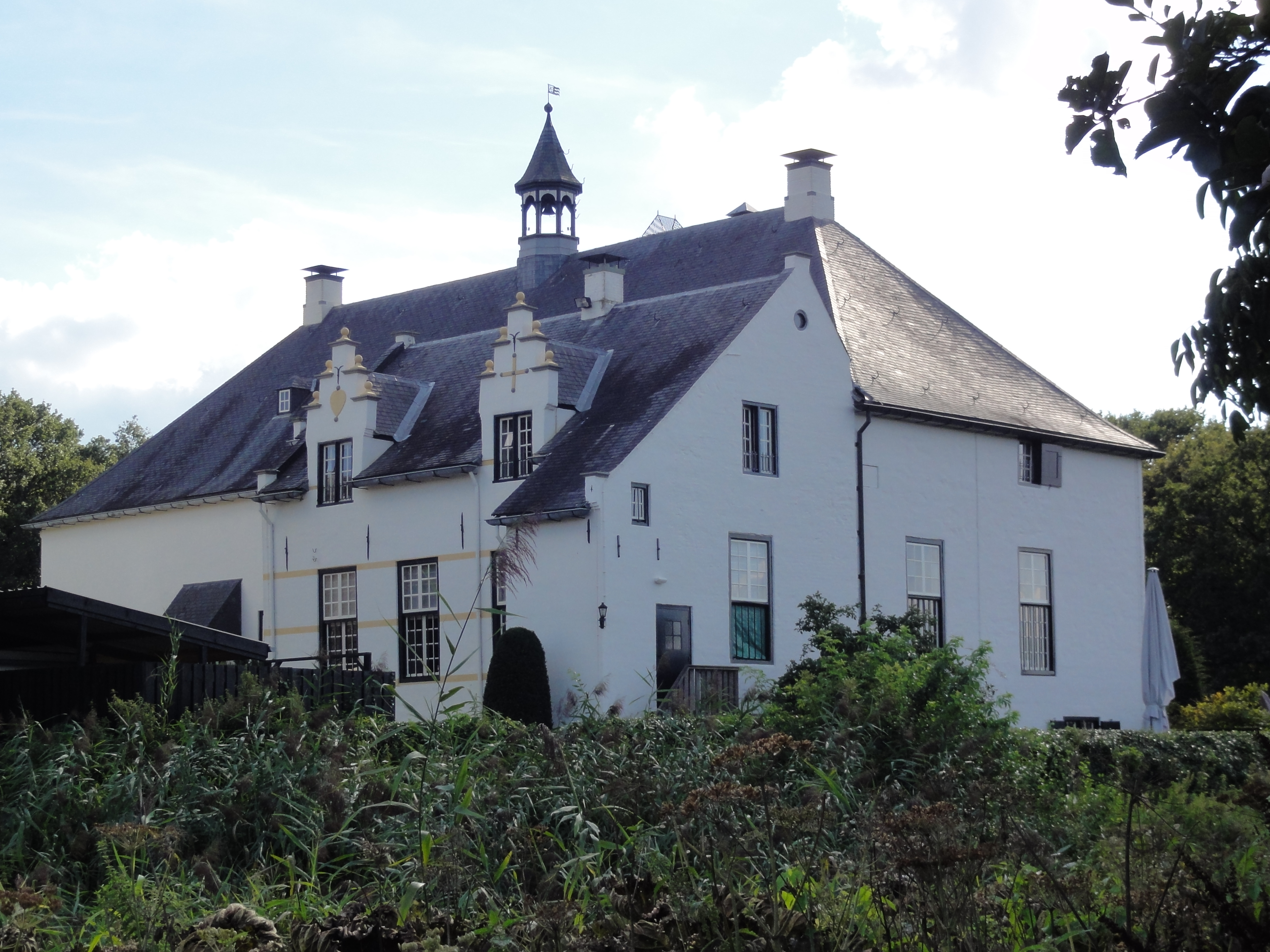
Doddendael Castle

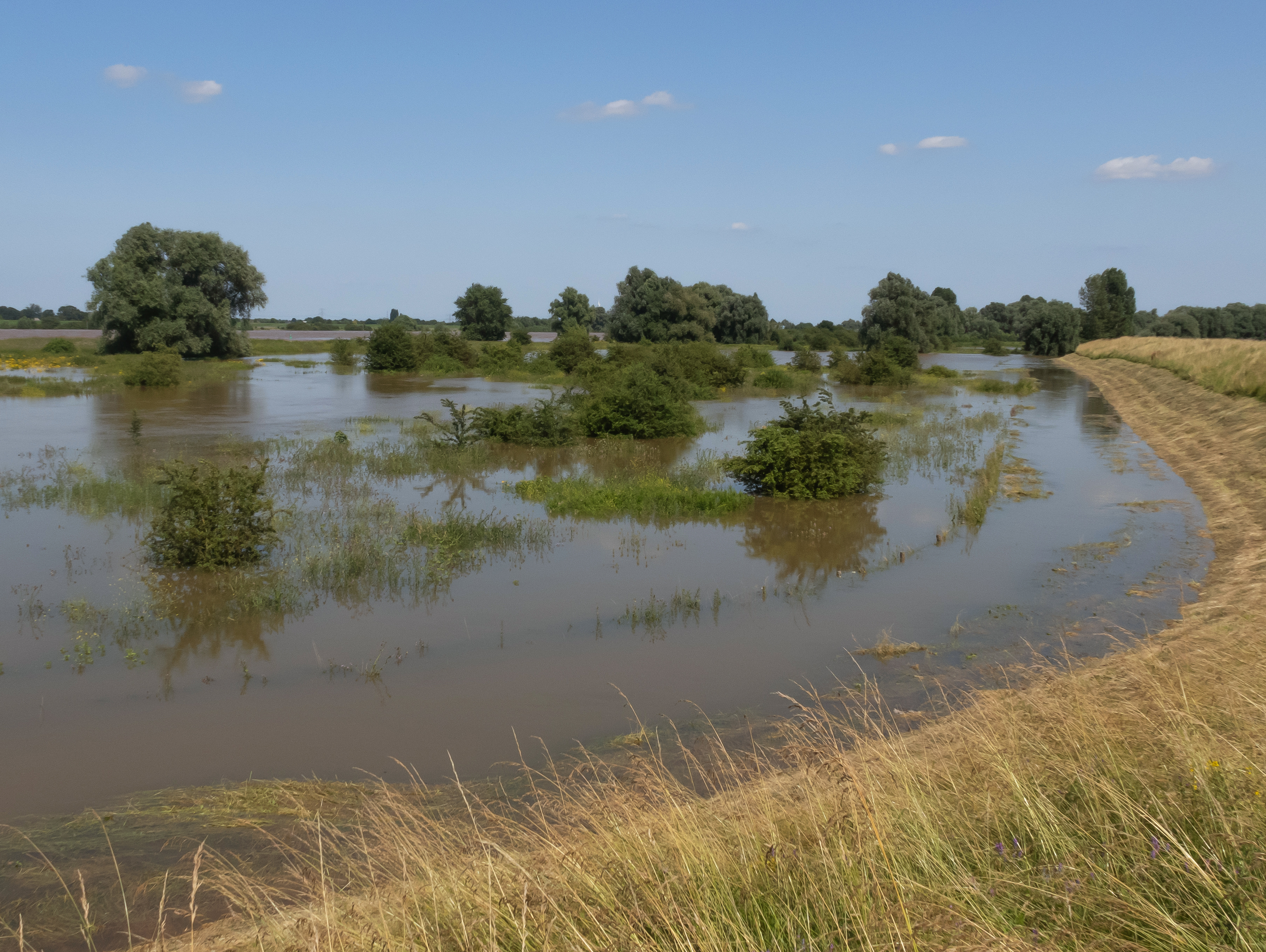
The Waal during high water

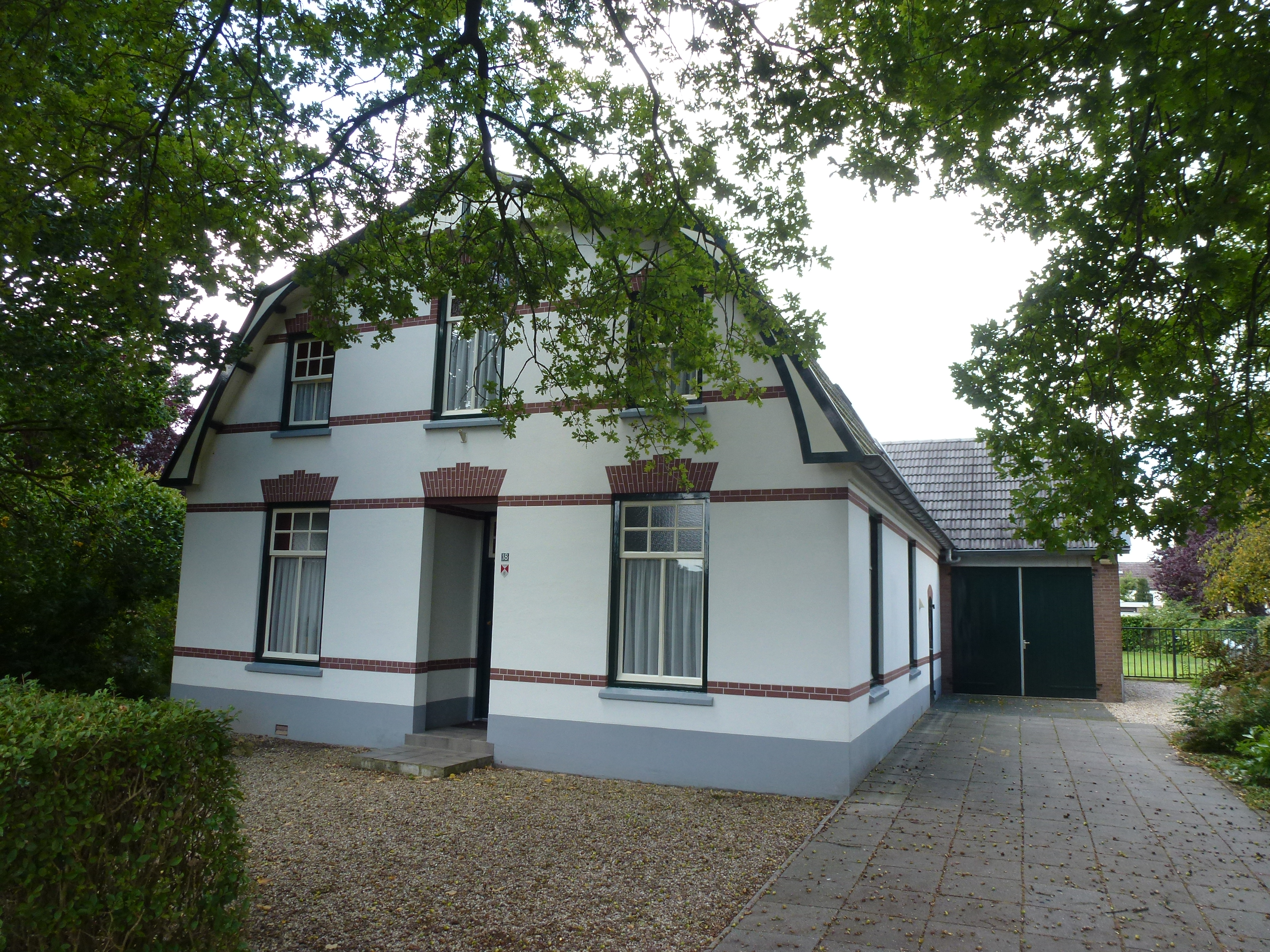
House in Ewijk
